= List of potter wasp genera =

The overwhelming morphological diversity of the potter wasp species is reflected in the proliferation of genera described to group them into more manageable groups. The following 200 genera are recognized as valid. An additional 16 genera previously treated under this subfamily have been split into the Zethinae.

== Genera ==
Tribe Eumenini

- Afreumenes
- Alphamenes
- Cyphomenes
- Delta
- Eumenes
- Ischnogasteroides
- Katamenes
- Laevimenes
- Minixi
- Omicroides
- Omicron
- Oreumenes
- Pachymenes
- Pachyminixi
- Pararhaphidoglossa
- Phimenes
- Pirhosigma
- Santamenes
- Sphaeromenes
- Stenosigma
- Zeta

Tribe Odynerini (paraphyletic)

- Abispa
- Acanthodynerus
- Acarepipona
- Acarodynerus
- Acarozumia
- Aethiopicodynerus
- Afrepipona
- Afrepsilon
- Afrodynerus
- Afrogamma
- Afroxanthodynerus
- Alastor
- Alastoroides
- Alastorynerus
- Allepipona
- Allodynerus
- Allorhynchium
- Ancistroceroides
- Ancistrocerus
- Antamenes
- Antepipona
- Anterhynchium
- Antezumia
- Antodynerus
- Apodynerus
- Archancistrocerus
- Aruodynerus
- Asiodynerus
- Astalor
- Australodynerus
- Brachymenes
- Brachyodynerus
- Brachypipona
- Carinstrocerus
- Cephalastor
- Cephalochilus
- Cephalodynerus
- Chelodynerus
- Chlorodynerus
- Coeleumenes
- Convextrocerus
- Cuyodynerus
- Cyphodynerus
- Cyrtalastor
- Cyrteumenes
- Cyrtolabulus
- Diemodynerus
- Dolichodynerus
- Ectopioglossa
- Elisella
- Emeryrhynchium
- Epiodynerus
- Epsilon
- Erodynerus
- Eudiscoelius
- Eumenidiopsis
- Eumicrodynerus
- Euodynerus
- Eustenancistrocerus
- Extreuodynerus
- Flammodynerus
- Flavoleptus
- Gamma
- Gastrodynerus
- Gibberrhynchium
- Gioiella
- Giordania
- Globepipona
- Globodynerus
- Gribodia
- Gymnomerus
- Hemipterochilis
- Hemipterochilus
- Hirtocoelius
- Hypalastoroides
- Hypancistrocerus
- Hypodynerus
- Immutatus
- Incodynerus
- Indodynerus
- Intereuodynerus
- Interzumia
- Irianmenes
- Jucancistrocerus
- Knemodynerus
- Labochilus
- Labus
- Lamellodynerus
- Latimenes
- Leptochiloides
- Leptochilus
- Leptodynerus
- Leptomenes
- Leptomenoides
- Leptomicrodynerus
- Leucodynerus
- Lissepipona
- Lissodynerus
- Malagassodynerus
- Malayepipona
- Malgachemenes
- Maricopodynerus
- Megaodynerus
- Micreumenes
- Microdynerus
- Mitrodynerus
- Monobia
- Monodynerus
- Montezumia
- Nesodynerus
- Nestocoelius
- Nirtenia
- Nortozumia
- Odynerus
- Okinawepipona
- Omicrabulus
- Onychopterocheilus
- Orancistrocerus
- Oreumenoides
- Orientalicesa
- Ovodynerus
- Pachodynerus
- Paragymnomerus
- Paralastor
- Paraleptomenes
- Paralionotulus
- Parancistrocerus
- Pararrhynchium
- Paravespa
- Parazumia
- Pareumenes
- Parifodynerus
- Parodontodynerus
- Parodynerus
- Plagiolabra
- Polistepipona
- Postepipona
- Proepipona
- Pseudabispa
- Pseudacaromenes
- Pseudagris
- Pseudalastor
- Pseudepipona
- Pseudochilus
- Pseudodontodynerus
- Pseudodynerus
- Pseudoleptochilus
- Pseudonortonia
- Pseudosymmorphus
- Pseudozumia
- Pseumenes
- Pterocheilus
- Raphiglossoides
- Rhynchagris
- Rhynchalastor
- Rhynchium
- Rugomenes
- Smeringodynerus
- Spinilabochilus
- Stellepipona
- Stenancistrocerus
- Stenodyneriellus
- Stenodynerus
- Stenonartonia
- Stroudia
- Subancistrocerus
- Symmorphoides
- Symmorphus
- Synagris
- Syneuodynerus
- Tachyancistrocerus
- Tachymenes
- Trachyodynerus
- Tricarinodynerus
- Tropidodynerus
- Tuleara
- Ubirodynerus
- Xanthodynerus
- Xenorhynchium
