= Nesodynerus =

Scientific classification
- Kingdom: Animalia
- Phylum: Arthropoda
- Clade: Pancrustacea
- Class: Insecta
- Order: Hymenoptera
- Family: Vespidae
- Subfamily: Eumeninae
- Genus: Nesodynerus (Perkins, 1901)

Type species
- Odynerus rudolphi Dalla Torre, 1889

Species
- See text

Genus of wasps

Nesodynerus is a genus of potter wasps endemic to the Hawaiian archipelago. This genus is surprisingly large (103 species) for the small territory it covers. The genera Chelodynerus and Pseudopterocheilus are presently treated as synonyms of Nesodynerus.

== Species ==
Nesodynerus contains the following species:

- Nesodynerus acoelogaster (Perkins)
- Nesodynerus acyanus (Perkins, 1910)
- Nesodynerus aprepes (Perkins, 1906)
- Nesodynerus axestes (Perkins, 1899)
- Nesodynerus blackburni (Kirby, 1879)
- Nesodynerus brevicostatus (Perkins, 1899)
- Nesodynerus caenosus (Perkins, 1899)
- Nesodynerus camelinus (Perkins, 1899)
- Nesodynerus cephalostictus (Perkins, 1899)
- Nesodynerus charadrophilus (Perkins, 1912)
- Nesodynerus conifer (Perkins, 1899)
- Nesodynerus cooki (Perkins, 1899)
- Nesodynerus crypterythrus (Perkins, 1902)
- Nesodynerus cyanopteryx (Perkins, 1899)
- Nesodynerus cyphotes (Perkins)
- Nesodynerus cypris (Perkins, 1902)
- Nesodynerus deinogaster (Perkins, 1899)
- Nesodynerus dilatipes (Perkins, 1899)
- Nesodynerus dromedarius (Blackburn, 1886)
- Nesodynerus dryas (Perkins, 1899)
- Nesodynerus dubiosus (Smith, 1879)
- Nesodynerus dyserythrias (Perkins, 1899)
- Nesodynerus egens (Perkins, 1899)
- Nesodynerus eludens (Perkins, 1899)
- Nesodynerus erythrognatus (Perkins)
- Nesodynerus erythrostactes (Perkins)
- Nesodynerus eupteryx (Perkins, 1899)
- Nesodynerus eutretus (Perkins, 1902)
- Nesodynerus flosculus (Perkins, 1899)
- Nesodynerus frater (Dalla Torre, 1894)
- Nesodynerus ganahli (Dalla Torre, 1904)
- Nesodynerus halaekalae (Blackburn, 1886)
- Nesodynerus hawaiiensis (Blackburn & Cameron)
- Nesodynerus heterochromus (Perkins)
- Nesodynerus hiloensis (Perkins, 1899)
- Nesodynerus holomelas (Perkins, 1902)
- Nesodynerus homochromus (Perkins, 1899)
- Nesodynerus homoeogaster (Perkins, 1899)
- Nesodynerus homoeophanes (Perkins, 1901)
- Nesodynerus hylophilus (Perkins, 1912)
- Nesodynerus illudens (Perkins, 1901)
- Nesodynerus insulicola (Blackburn)
- Nesodynerus iopteryx (Perkins, 1899)
- Nesodynerus kauaiensis (Perkins, 1899)
- Nesodynerus kauensis (Giffard, 1916)
- Nesodynerus kirbyi (Dalla Torre)
- Nesodynerus konanus (Perkins, 1899)
- Nesodynerus koolauensis (Giffard, 1913)
- Nesodynerus laevisulcatus (Perkins, 1899)
- Nesodynerus lanaiensis (Perkins, 1899)
- Nesodynerus leiodemas (Perkins)
- Nesodynerus leucozonias (Perkins, 1899)
- Nesodynerus lipocharis (Perkins, 1910)
- Nesodynerus litoralis (Giffard, 1916)
- Nesodynerus melanognathus (Perkins, 1899)
- Nesodynerus mesospilus (Perkins, 1902)
- Nesodynerus microdemas (Perkins, 1899)
- Nesodynerus mimus (Perkins, 1899)
- Nesodynerus molokaiensis (Perkins, 1899)
- Nesodynerus monas (Perkins, 1906)
- Nesodynerus monobius (Perkins, 1899)
- Nesodynerus montanus (Smith, 1879)
- Nesodynerus montivagus (Perkins, 1899)
- Nesodynerus naiadum (Perkins, 1899)
- Nesodynerus nautarum (de Saussure, 1856)
- Nesodynerus nesiotes (Perkins, 1899)
- Nesodynerus newelli (Perkins, 1902)
- Nesodynerus niihauensis (Yosh., 1959)
- Nesodynerus nivicola (Perkins, 1899)
- Nesodynerus nubicola (Perkins, 1899)
- Nesodynerus oahensis (Dalla Torre)
- Nesodynerus oahuensis (Dalla Torre, 1889)
- Nesodynerus oblitus (Perkins, 1899)
- Nesodynerus obscurepunctatus (Blackburn & Cameron)
- Nesodynerus optabilis (Perkins, 1901)
- Nesodynerus orbus (Perkins)
- Nesodynerus paganensis (Yas., 1945)
- Nesodynerus paractias (Perkins, 1906)
- Nesodynerus paranaias (Perkins, 1906)
- Nesodynerus paludicola (Perkins, 1901)
- Nesodynerus peles (Perkins)
- Nesodynerus pseudochromus (Perkins, 1899)
- Nesodynerus purpurifer (Perkins, 1899)
- Nesodynerus rubritinctus (Smith, 1879)
- Nesodynerus rubropustulatus (Blackburn, 1886)
- Nesodynerus rudolphi (Dalla Torre, 1889)
- Nesodynerus saipanensis (Yas., 1945)
- Nesodynerus sandwichensis (de Saussure, 1856)
- Nesodynerus scoriaceus (Perkins)
- Nesodynerus smithii (Dalla Torre, 1889)
- Nesodynerus sociabilis (Perkins)
- Nesodynerus soror (Perkins, 1899)
- Nesodynerus subegens (Perkins, 1910)
- Nesodynerus tempe (Perkins, 1906)
- Nesodynerus thersites (Perkins, 1910)
- Nesodynerus threnodes (Perkins, 1899)
- Nesodynerus unicus (Perkins)
- Nesodynerus vittativentris (Perkins, 1899)
- Nesodynerus vulcanus (Blackburn & Cameron)
- Nesodynerus waianaeanus (Perkins, 1899)
- Nesodynerus xanthorhoes (Perkins, 1899)
- Nesodynerus xerobius (Perkins, 1912)
- Nesodynerus xerophilus (Perkins)
