= Spinilabochilus =

Scientific classification
- Domain: Eukaryota
- Kingdom: Animalia
- Phylum: Arthropoda
- Class: Insecta
- Order: Hymenoptera
- Family: Vespidae
- Subfamily: Eumeninae
- Genus: Spinilabochilus; Kurzenko, 1981

Type species
- Spinilabochilus turcmenicus Kurzenko, 1981

Species
- Spinilabochilus deserticola (Kostylev, 1935); Spinilabochilus turcmenicus Kurzenko, 1981

Genus of wasps

Spinilabochilus is a Palearctic genus of potter wasps.
