= Globodynerus =

Scientific classification
- Domain: Eukaryota
- Kingdom: Animalia
- Phylum: Arthropoda
- Class: Insecta
- Order: Hymenoptera
- Family: Vespidae
- Genus: Globodynerus; Giordani Soika, 1987
- Species: G. globosus

Binomial name
- Globodynerus globosus Giordani Soika, 1987

Genus of wasps

Globodynerus is an afrotropical genus of potter wasps with a single species, Globodynerus globosus.
