= Laevimenes =

Scientific classification
- Domain: Eukaryota
- Kingdom: Animalia
- Phylum: Arthropoda
- Class: Insecta
- Order: Hymenoptera
- Family: Vespidae
- Subfamily: Eumeninae
- Genus: Laevimenes; Giordani Soika, 1978

Type species
- Laevimenes morbillosus Brèthes, 1906

Species
- Laevimenes laevigatus (Brèthes, 1906); Laevimenes morbillosus (Giordani Soika, 1978)

Genus of wasps

Laevimenes is a small neotropical genus of potter wasps which contains two species which live mainly in the Chaco and Cerrado biogeographical provinces.
