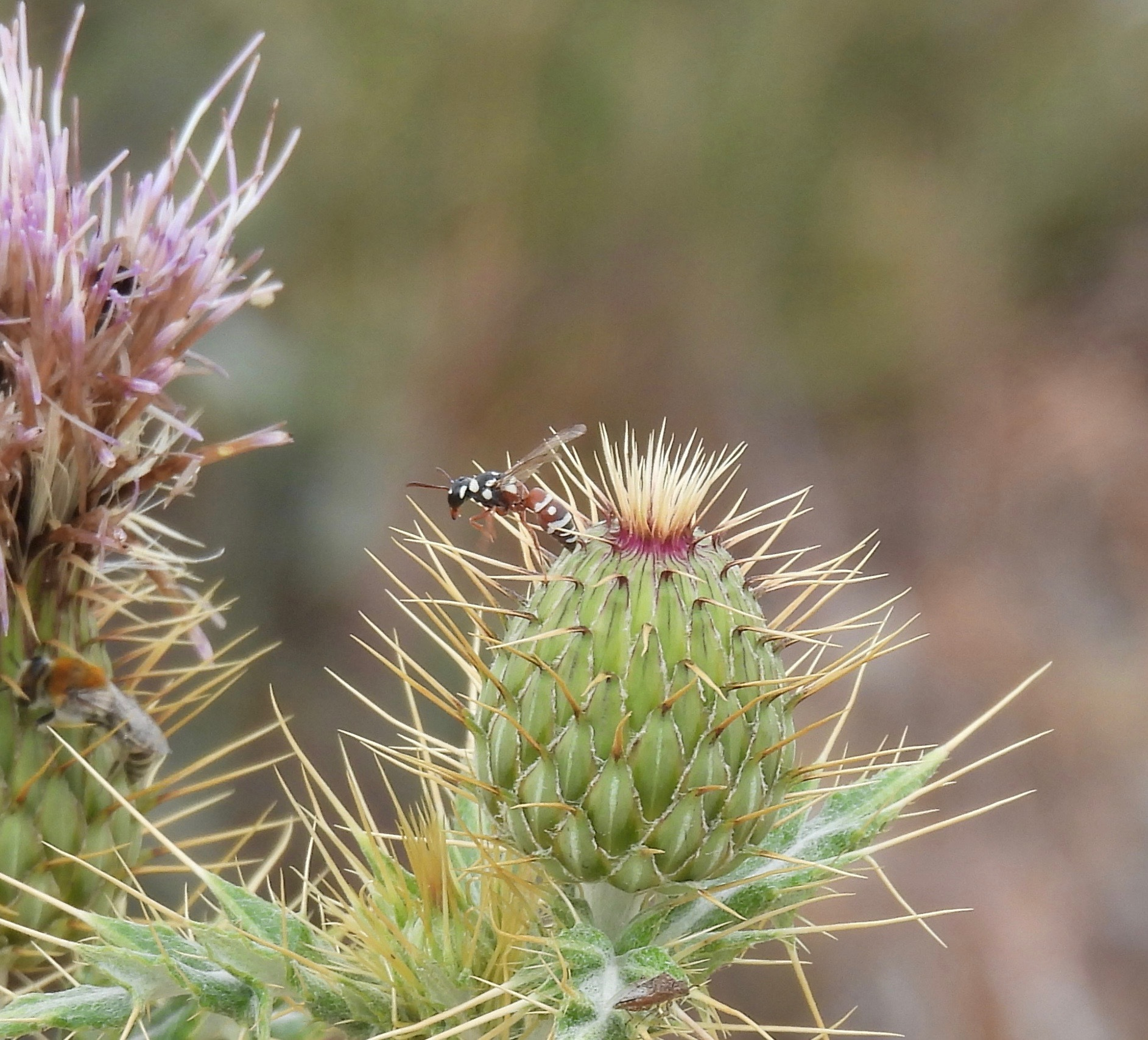
- Leucodynerus, Eddy County, New Mexico (2020)

Scientific classification
- Kingdom: Animalia
- Phylum: Arthropoda
- Class: Insecta
- Order: Hymenoptera
- Family: Vespidae
- Subfamily: Eumeninae
- Genus: Leucodynerus; Bohart, 1982

Type species
- Odynerus congressus Viereck, 1908

Species
- Leucodynerus cockerelli (Cameron, 1908); Leucodynerus congressus (Viereck, 1908); Leucodynerus martini (Bohart); Leucodynerus russatus (Bohart); Leucodynerus samiatus Bohart; Leucodynerus tetralobus (Bohart)

= Leucodynerus =

Genus of wasps

Leucodynerus is a Nearctic genus of small sized potter wasps distributed in south western United States and northern Mexico.
