= Xanthodynerus =

Scientific classification
- Domain: Eukaryota
- Kingdom: Animalia
- Phylum: Arthropoda
- Class: Insecta
- Order: Hymenoptera
- Family: Vespidae
- Subfamily: Eumeninae
- Genus: Xanthodynerus; Blüthgen, 1954

Type species
- Xanthodynerus octavus (Giordani Soika, 1943)

Species
- Xanthodynerus castrorum (Blüthgen, 1954); Xanthodynerus caucasicus (Giordani Soika, 1960); Xanthodynerus dentipes (Kostylev, 1940); Xanthodynerus jordanicus Gusenleitner, 1990; Xanthodynerus octavus (Giordani Soika, 1943); Xanthodynerus pilosus Gusenleitner, 1990; Xanthodynerus splendens (Giordani Soika, 1957); Xanthodynerus trichopygus (Blüthgen, 1954); Xanthodynerus tripunctata Giordani Soika, 1989

Genus of wasps

Xanthodynerus is a genus of potter wasps known from the Afrotropical and Palearctic regions. It may be synonymous with Euodynerus.
