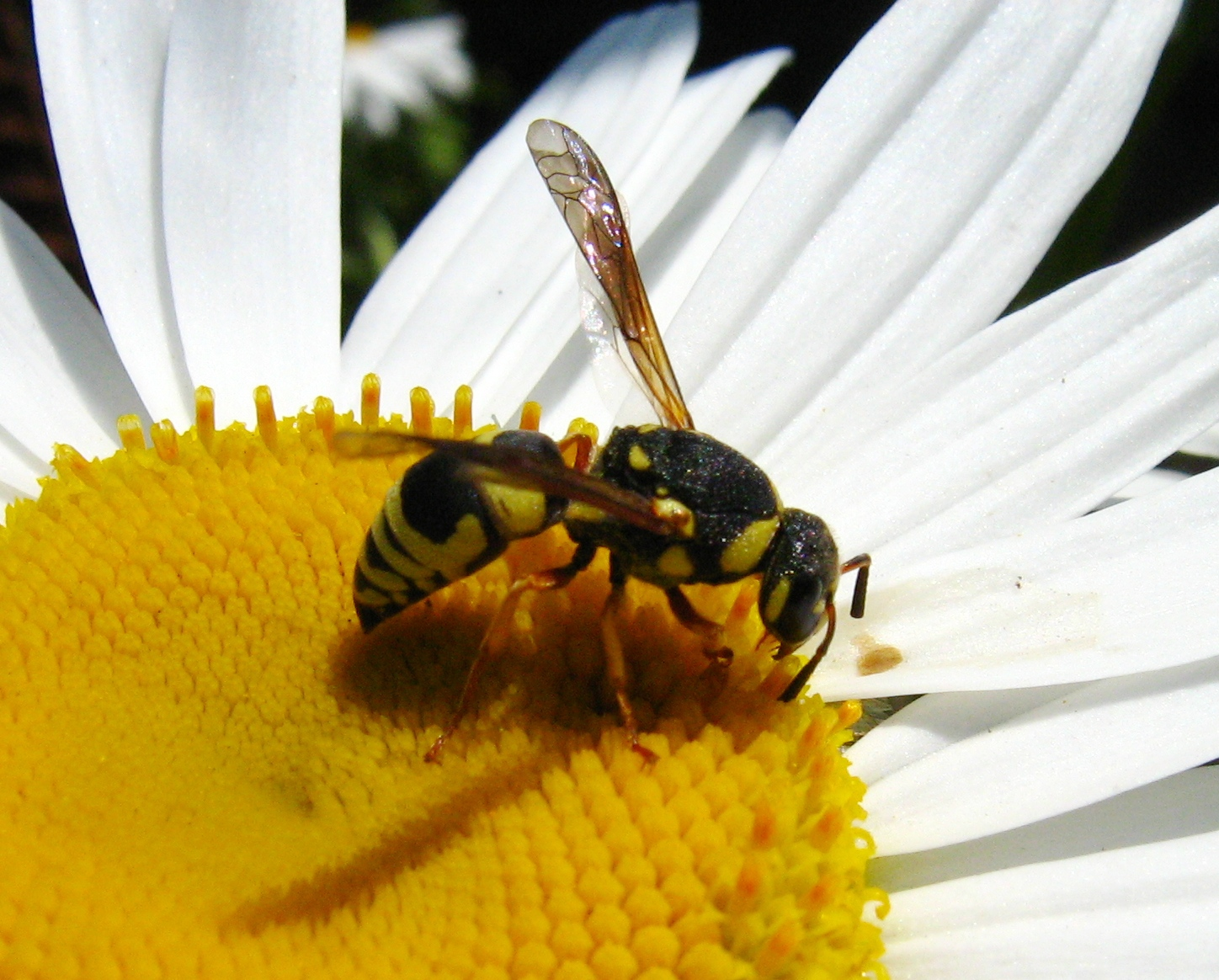
- Syneuodynerus sp

Scientific classification
- Domain: Eukaryota
- Kingdom: Animalia
- Phylum: Arthropoda
- Class: Insecta
- Order: Hymenoptera
- Family: Vespidae
- Subfamily: Eumeninae
- Genus: Syneuodynerus; Blüthgen

Species
- Syneuodynerus egregius Gusenleitner 1970; Syneuodynerus gebi Gusenleitner 1970; Syneuodynerus erichi Gusenleitner 1967; Syneuodynerus insolitus Gusenleitner 1994

= Syneuodynerus =

Genus of wasps

Syneuodynerus is a genus of potter wasps with four species known from Near East, this genus is now regarded as having been synonymised with Euodynerus.
