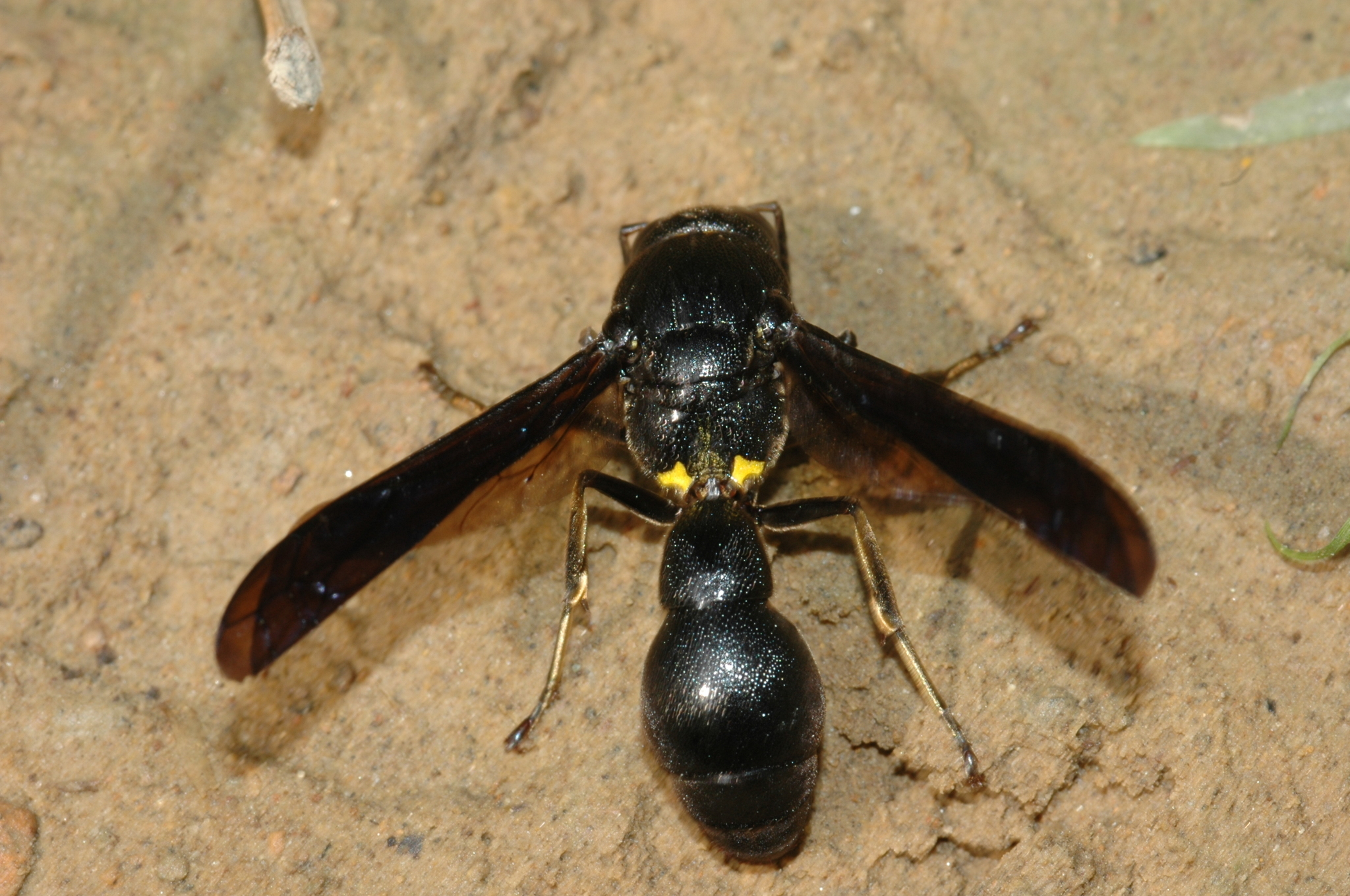
- Pseudozumia indosinensis

Scientific classification
- Domain: Eukaryota
- Kingdom: Animalia
- Phylum: Arthropoda
- Class: Insecta
- Order: Hymenoptera
- Family: Vespidae
- Subfamily: Eumeninae
- Genus: Pseudozumia; Saussure, 1875

Type species
- Pseudozumia indica (Saussure, 1855)

Species
- Pseudozumia bimaculata (Meade-Waldo, 1911); Pseudozumia gracilis Vecht, 1963; Pseudozumia indica (Saussure, 1855); Pseudozumia indosinensis Giordani Soika, 1958; Pseudozumia orientalis (Gribodo, 1891); Pseudozumia taiwana (Sonan, 1937); Pseudozumia viridipennis Giordani Soika, 1958

= Pseudozumia =

Genus of wasps

Pseudozumia is a small genus of potter wasps which is found in the Afrotropical and Indomalayan regions.
