= Malgachemenes =

Scientific classification
- Domain: Eukaryota
- Kingdom: Animalia
- Phylum: Arthropoda
- Class: Insecta
- Order: Hymenoptera
- Family: Vespidae
- Genus: Malgachemenes; Gusenleitner, 1992
- Species: M. angustus

Binomial name
- Malgachemenes angustus Gusenleitner, 1992

Genus of wasps

Malgachemenes is a monotypic genus of potter wasps endemic to Madagascar. The sole species is Malgachemenes angustus.
