= Stellepipona =

Scientific classification
- Domain: Eukaryota
- Kingdom: Animalia
- Phylum: Arthropoda
- Class: Insecta
- Order: Hymenoptera
- Family: Vespidae
- Subfamily: Eumeninae
- Genus: Stellepipona; Giordani Soika, 1974

Type species
- Stellepipona aequinoxialis (Saussure, 1856)

Species
- Stellepipona aequinoxialis (Saussure, 1856); Stellepipona brevicornis Giordani Soika, 1987; Stellepipona guillarmodi Giordani Soika, 1973; Stellepipona invida Giordani Soika, 1987; Stellepipona lamellata Giordani Soika, 1987; Stellepipona ochraceotincta Giordani Soika, 1987; Stellepipona pilosissima Giordani Soika, 1987

Genus of wasps

Stellepipona is a small (7 species currently recognized) Afrotropical genus of potter wasps.
