= Pseudacaromenes =

Scientific classification
- Domain: Eukaryota
- Kingdom: Animalia
- Phylum: Arthropoda
- Class: Insecta
- Order: Hymenoptera
- Family: Vespidae
- Subfamily: Eumeninae
- Genus: Pseudacaromenes; Giordani Soika, 1978

Type species
- Pseudacaromenes alfkenii (Ducke, 1904)

Species
- Pseudacaromenes alfkenii (Ducke, 1904); Pseudacaromenes johnsoni (Cameron, 1907)

Genus of wasps

Pseudacaromenes is a small Neotropical genus of large potter wasps containing two known species: the Amazon basin endemic Pseudacaromenes alfkenii and the widespread (Mexico to Paraguay) Pseudacaromenes johnsoni.
