= Malayepipona =

Scientific classification
- Domain: Eukaryota
- Kingdom: Animalia
- Phylum: Arthropoda
- Class: Insecta
- Order: Hymenoptera
- Family: Vespidae
- Subfamily: Eumeninae
- Genus: Malayepipona; Gordani Soika, 1993

Type species
- Malayepipona pagdeni Giordani Soika, 1993

Species
- Malayepipona assamensis Giordani Soika, 1995; Malayepipona clypeata Nguyen & Carpenter, 2013; Malayepipona furva Nguyen & Carpenter, 2013; Malayepipona visenda Gusenleitner, 2012; Malayepipona pagdeni Giordani Soika, 1993; Malayepipona seomyty Nguyen & Carpenter, 2013

Genus of wasps

Malayepipona is an Indomalayan genus of potter wasps which contains six species.
