= Gibberrhynchium =

Scientific classification
- Domain: Eukaryota
- Kingdom: Animalia
- Phylum: Arthropoda
- Class: Insecta
- Order: Hymenoptera
- Family: Vespidae
- Subfamily: Eumeninae
- Genus: Gibberrhynchium; Bluthgen, 1938

Species
- Gibberrhynchium gibber Gusenleitner, 2002; Gibberhynchium masariforme (Giordani Soika, 1934)

Genus of wasps

Gibberrhynchium is a small Afrotropical genus of potter wasps.

It was considered to be monotypic with the only species being Gibberhynchium masariforme (Giordani Soika 1934), which is widely distributed though Central Africa (Democratic Republic of Congo, Malawi, Tanzania, Zambia and Zimbabwe).

A second species, Gibberrhynchium gibber, was described by Josef Gusenleitner in 2002 from the Democratic Republic of Congo.
