= Astalor =

Scientific classification
- Domain: Eukaryota
- Kingdom: Animalia
- Phylum: Arthropoda
- Class: Insecta
- Order: Hymenoptera
- Family: Vespidae
- Subfamily: Eumeninae
- Genus: Astalor von Schultheß, 1925

Species
- Astalor insalubris Giordani Soika, 1989; Astalor maidli (von Schultheß, 1925)

Genus of wasps

Astalor is a small Afrotropical genus of potter wasps containing two species.
