= Emeryrhynchium =

Scientific classification
- Domain: Eukaryota
- Kingdom: Animalia
- Phylum: Arthropoda
- Class: Insecta
- Order: Hymenoptera
- Family: Vespidae
- Genus: Emeryrhynchium; Gusenleitner, 2007
- Species: E. emeryanus

Binomial name
- Emeryrhynchium emeryanus (Gribodo 1892)

Genus of wasps

Emeryrhynchium is a monotypical afrotropical genus of potter wasps known from Equatorial Africa (Democratic Republic of Congo, Equatorial Guinea and Sierra Leone). Its only known species is Emeryrhynchium emeryanus (Gribodo 1892).
