= Minixi =

Scientific classification
- Domain: Eukaryota
- Kingdom: Animalia
- Phylum: Arthropoda
- Class: Insecta
- Order: Hymenoptera
- Family: Vespidae
- Subfamily: Eumeninae
- Genus: Minixi; Giordani Soika, 1978

Type species
- Eumenes mexicanus Saussure, 1857

Species
- Minixi brasilianum (Saussure, 1875); Minixi mexicanum (Saussure, 1857); Minixi suffusum (Fox 1899); Minixi tricoloratum (Zavattari, 1911)

Genus of wasps

Minixi is a small neotropical genus of potter wasps currently containing 4 species. One species (Minixi mexicanum) is restricted to Southern United States, Mexico and Central America. The other three species are rather common and widespread through eastern South America.
