= Sphaeromenes =

Scientific classification
- Domain: Eukaryota
- Kingdom: Animalia
- Phylum: Arthropoda
- Class: Insecta
- Order: Hymenoptera
- Family: Vespidae
- Subfamily: Eumeninae
- Genus: Sphaeromenes; Giordani Soika, 1978

Type species
- Sphaeromenes discrepatus Giordani Soika, 1978

Species
- Sphaeromenes discrepatus Giordani Soika, 1978; Sphaeromenes elizabethae Vecht, 1980

Genus of wasps

Sphaeromenes is a small Neotropical genus of potter wasps.
