= Cyrteumenes =

Scientific classification
- Domain: Eukaryota
- Kingdom: Animalia
- Phylum: Arthropoda
- Class: Insecta
- Order: Hymenoptera
- Family: Vespidae
- Subfamily: Eumeninae
- Genus: Cyrteumenes; Giordani Soika, 1991

Genus of wasps

Cyrteumenes is a Malagasy genus of potter wasps. It contains the following species:

- Cyrteumenes floricola (Saussure, 1890)
- Cyrteumenes mochii Borsato, 1999
- Cyrteumenes seyrigi (Giordani Soika, 1934)
