= Omicroides =

Scientific classification
- Domain: Eukaryota
- Kingdom: Animalia
- Phylum: Arthropoda
- Class: Insecta
- Order: Hymenoptera
- Family: Vespidae
- Genus: Omicroides; Giordani Soika, 1935
- Species: O. singularis

Binomial name
- Omicroides singularis (Smith, 1858)

Genus of wasps

Omicroides is a monotypic Indomalayan genus of potter wasps. The sole species is Omicroides singularis.
