= Extreuodynerus =

Scientific classification
- Domain: Eukaryota
- Kingdom: Animalia
- Phylum: Arthropoda
- Class: Insecta
- Order: Hymenoptera
- Family: Vespidae
- Subfamily: Eumeninae
- Genus: Extreuodynerus; Gusenleitner, 2007
- Species: E. mirificus

Binomial name
- Extreuodynerus mirificus Gusenleitner, 2007

Genus of wasps

Extreuodynerus is an Afrotropical genus of potter wasps with a single described species Extreuodynerus mirificus.
