= Pseudepipona =

Scientific classification
- Kingdom: Animalia
- Phylum: Arthropoda
- Clade: Pancrustacea
- Class: Insecta
- Order: Hymenoptera
- Family: Vespidae
- Subfamily: Eumeninae
- Genus: Pseudepipona; Saussure, 1856

Type species
- Pseudepipona herrichii (Saussure, 1856)

Species
- See text

Genus of wasps

Pseudepipona is a genus of potter wasps found in the Palearctic, Nearctic, Afrotropical and Australian regions.

== Species ==
- Pseudepipona ankarensis Giordani Soika, 1970
- Pseudepipona atlantica Giordani Soika, 1969
- Pseudepipona augusta (Moravitz, 1867)
- Pseudepipona beckeri (Moravitz, 1867)
- Pseudepipona bella Gusenleitner, 2012
- Pseudepipona cretensis Blüthgen 1941
- Pseudepipona filipalpis (Saussure, 1853)
- Pseudepipona gineri (Schulthess, 1934)
- Pseudepipona herrichii (Saussure, 1856)
- Pseudepipona herzi (Moravitz, 1895)
- Pseudepipona inexspectata (Blüthgen 1955)
- Pseudepipona ionius (Saussure, 1855)
- Pseudepipona jugorum Blüthgen 1942
- Pseudepipona kazenasi Kurzenko, 1974
- Pseudepipona kostylevi Fateryga, 2022
- Pseudepipona kozhevnikovi (Kostylev, 1927)
- Pseudepipona lamellifera Giordani Soika, 1987
- Pseudepipona lativentris (Saussure, 1855)
- Pseudepipona nikolayi Fateryga, 2022
- Pseudepipona niveopicta Giordani Soika, 1970
- Pseudepipona oasis Giordani Soika, 1958
- Pseudepipona peculiaris (Moravitz, 1895)
- Pseudepipona popovi Fateryga, 2022
- Pseudepipona priesneri Gusenleitner, 1970
- Pseudepipona przewalskyi (Morawitz, 1885)
- Pseudepipona pseudominuta Gusenleitner, 1971
- Pseudepipona rubida Gusenleitner, 1994
- Pseudepipona rubiginosa (Andre, 1884)
- Pseudepipona sellata (Moravitz, 1885)
- Pseudepipona sessilis (Saussure 1853)
- Pseudepipona straminea (Andre, 1884)
- Pseudepipona superba (Morawitz, 1867)
- Pseudepipona tricarinata (Kokujev, 1912)
- Pseudepipona tripunctata (Fabricius, 1787)
- Pseudepipona ushinskii (Kostylev, 1940)
- Pseudepipona vicina Gusenleitner, 1973
- Pseudepipona vladimiri Fateryga, 2022
