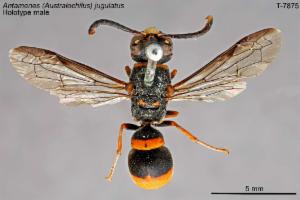
- mounted specimen of a male from the Victoria Museum

Scientific classification
- Domain: Eukaryota
- Kingdom: Animalia
- Phylum: Arthropoda
- Class: Insecta
- Order: Hymenoptera
- Family: Vespidae
- Subfamily: Eumeninae
- Genus: Antamenes (Giordani Soika, 1958)

Species
- Antamenes amicus; Antamenes annulatus; Antamenes citreocinctus; Antamenes ferrugineus; Antamenes flavoniger; Antamenes hackeri; Antamenes hostilis; Antamenes jugulatus; Antamenes pseudoneotropicus; Antamenes tasmaniae; Antamenes tridens; Antamenes tridentatus; Antamenes unicornis; Antamenes vernalis; Antamenes vorticosus

= Antamenes =

Genus of wasps

Antamenes is an Australasian genus of potter wasps.
