= Immutatus =

Scientific classification
- Domain: Eukaryota
- Kingdom: Animalia
- Phylum: Arthropoda
- Class: Insecta
- Order: Hymenoptera
- Family: Vespidae
- Genus: Immutatus; Gusenleitner, 2011
- Species: I. sakalavus

Binomial name
- Immutatus sakalavus (Saussure, 1900)

Genus of wasps

Immutatus is a monotypic genus of potter wasps from Madagascar. The sole species is Immutatus sakalavus.
