= Flammodynerus =

Scientific classification
- Domain: Eukaryota
- Kingdom: Animalia
- Phylum: Arthropoda
- Class: Insecta
- Order: Hymenoptera
- Family: Vespidae
- Subfamily: Eumeninae
- Genus: Flammodynerus; Giordani Soika, 1962

Type species
- Odynerus subalaris Saussure, 1856

Species
- Flammodynerus flammiger (Saussure, 1856); Flammodynerus pseudoloris Giordani Giordani Soika, 1961; Flammodynerus subalaris (Saussure, 1856)

Genus of wasps

Flammodynerus is an Australian genus of potter wasps.
