= Erodynerus =

Scientific classification
- Kingdom: Animalia
- Phylum: Arthropoda
- Class: Insecta
- Order: Hymenoptera
- Family: Vespidae
- Subfamily: Eumeninae
- Genus: Erodynerus; Giordani Soika, 1993

Species
- Erodynerus maculipennis (Smith, 1858); Erodynerus oculatus Giordani Soika, 1995

Genus of potter wasps

Erodynerus is a small Indomalayan genus of potter wasps.
