= Smeringodynerus =

Scientific classification
- Domain: Eukaryota
- Kingdom: Animalia
- Phylum: Arthropoda
- Class: Insecta
- Order: Hymenoptera
- Family: Vespidae
- Subfamily: Eumeninae
- Genus: Smeringodynerus; Snelling, 1975

Type species
- Smeringodynerus morelios (Saussure, 1857)

Species
- Smeringodynerus byroni (Rodriguez-Palafox, 1999); Smeringodynerus morelios (Saussure, 1857)

Genus of wasps

Smeringodynerus is a Nearctic genus of potter wasps.
