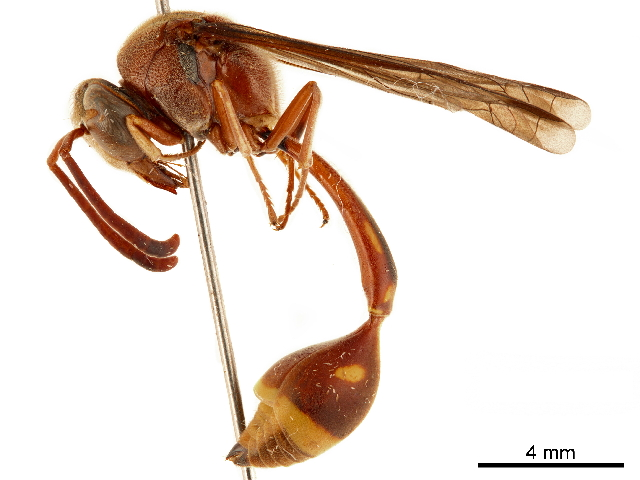
- Oreumenoides edwardsii preserved specimen

Scientific classification
- Kingdom: Animalia
- Phylum: Arthropoda
- Class: Insecta
- Order: Hymenoptera
- Family: Vespidae
- Subfamily: Eumeninae
- Genus: Oreumenoides; Giordani Soika, 1961

= Oreumenoides =

Genus of wasps

Oreumenoides is an Indomalayan genus of potter wasps.
