= Afrogamma =

Scientific classification
- Kingdom: Animalia
- Phylum: Arthropoda
- Clade: Pancrustacea
- Class: Insecta
- Order: Hymenoptera
- Family: Vespidae
- Subfamily: Eumeninae
- Genus: Afrogamma; Giordani Soika, 1987

Species
- Afrogamma gibbosum Giordani Soika, 1987

Genus of wasps

Afrogamma is an afrotropical genus of potter wasps.
