= Ectopioglossa =

Scientific classification
- Domain: Eukaryota
- Kingdom: Animalia
- Phylum: Arthropoda
- Class: Insecta
- Order: Hymenoptera
- Family: Vespidae
- Subfamily: Eumeninae
- Genus: Ectopioglossa; Perkins, 1912

Species
- See text

Genus of wasps

Ectopioglossa is an Indomalayan and Afrotropical genus of potter wasps. It contains the following species:

- Ectopioglossa advocata (Giordani Soika, 1944)
- Ectopioglossa africana Gusenleitner, 2010
- Ectopioglossa borsatoi Giordani Soika, 1996
- Ectopioglossa henseni Gusenleitner, 1990
- Ectopioglossa keiseri Vecht, 1963
- Ectopioglossa laminata Vecht, 1963
- Ectopioglossa lucida Vecht, 1963
- Ectopioglossa luzonica Selis, 2018
- Ectopioglossa mutata Gusenleitner, 1991
- Ectopioglossa nigerrima Giordani Soika, 1989
- Ectopioglossa ovalis Giordani Soika, 1993
- Ectopioglossa palustris Vecht, 1963
- Ectopioglossa polita (Smith, 1861)
- Ectopioglossa samriensis (Giordani Soika, 1941)
- Ectopioglossa sublaevis Vecht, 1963
- Ectopioglossa sudanensis Selis, 2023
- Ectopioglossa sumbana Vecht, 1963
- Ectopioglossa taiwana (Sonan, 1938)
