= Parifodynerus =

Scientific classification
- Domain: Eukaryota
- Kingdom: Animalia
- Phylum: Arthropoda
- Class: Insecta
- Order: Hymenoptera
- Family: Vespidae
- Subfamily: Eumeninae
- Genus: Parifodynerus; Giordani Soika, 1962

Type species
- Parifodynerus parificus Giordani Soika, 1962

Species
- Parifodynerus alariformis (Saussure, 1856); Parifodynerus parificus Giordani Soika, 1961; Parifodynerus septentrionalis Borsato, 1996

Genus of wasps

Parifodynerus is an Australasian genus of potter wasps.
