= Ischnogasteroides =

Scientific classification
- Domain: Eukaryota
- Kingdom: Animalia
- Phylum: Arthropoda
- Class: Insecta
- Order: Hymenoptera
- Family: Vespidae
- Subfamily: Eumeninae
- Genus: Ischnogasteroides; Magretti, 1884

Type species
- Ischnogasteroides flavus Magretti, 1884

Species
- See taxt

Genus of wasps

Ischnogasteroides is an Afrotropical and Palearctic genus of potter wasps. It currently includes the following species:

- Ischnogasteroides annae (Kostylev, 1939)
- Ischnogasteroides carinatus (Kostylev, 1939)
- Ischnogasteroides flavus Magretti, 1884
- Ischnogasteroides gracillimus (Giordani Soika, 1941)
- Ischnogasteroides leptogaster (Walker, 1871)
- Ischnogasteroides picteti (Saussure, 1852)
- Ischnogasteroides tenuissimus (Giordani Soika, 1941)
- Ischnogasteroides zarudnyi (Kostylev, 1939)
