= Tuleara =

Scientific classification
- Domain: Eukaryota
- Kingdom: Animalia
- Phylum: Arthropoda
- Class: Insecta
- Order: Hymenoptera
- Family: Vespidae
- Genus: Tuleara; Gusenleitner, 2000
- Species: T. leptochiloides

Binomial name
- Tuleara leptochiloides Gusenleitner, 2000

Genus of wasps

Tuleara is a monotypic genus of potter wasps which is endemic to Madagascar. The sole species is Tuleara leptochiloides.
