= Asiodynerus =

Scientific classification
- Kingdom: Animalia
- Phylum: Arthropoda
- Class: Insecta
- Order: Hymenoptera
- Family: Vespidae
- Subfamily: Eumeninae
- Genus: Asiodynerus; Kurzenko, 1977

Species
- Asiodynerus lucifer (Kostylev, 1937)

Genus of wasps

Asiodynerus is a genus of potter wasps found in Mongolia.
