= Polistepipona =

Scientific classification
- Kingdom: Animalia
- Phylum: Arthropoda
- Class: Insecta
- Order: Hymenoptera
- Family: Vespidae
- Subfamily: Eumeninae
- Genus: Polistepipona

Genus of wasps

Polistepipona is an Afrotropical genus of potter wasps.

== Species ==
Species:

- Polistepipona graciliventris (Giordani Soika)
- Polistepipona polistiformis (Giordani Soika)
