= Alastoroides =

Scientific classification
- Kingdom: Animalia
- Phylum: Arthropoda
- Clade: Pancrustacea
- Class: Insecta
- Order: Hymenoptera
- Family: Vespidae
- Subfamily: Eumeninae
- Genus: Alastoroides; Saussure, 1856

Species
- Alastoroides clotho

Genus of wasps

Alastoroides is a genus of potter wasps.
