= Lissodynerus =

Scientific classification
- Kingdom: Animalia
- Phylum: Arthropoda
- Clade: Pancrustacea
- Class: Insecta
- Order: Hymenoptera
- Family: Vespidae
- Subfamily: Eumeninae
- Genus: Lissodynerus; Giordani Soika, 1993

Type species
- Odynerus septemfasciatus Smith, 1858

Species
- See text

Genus of wasps

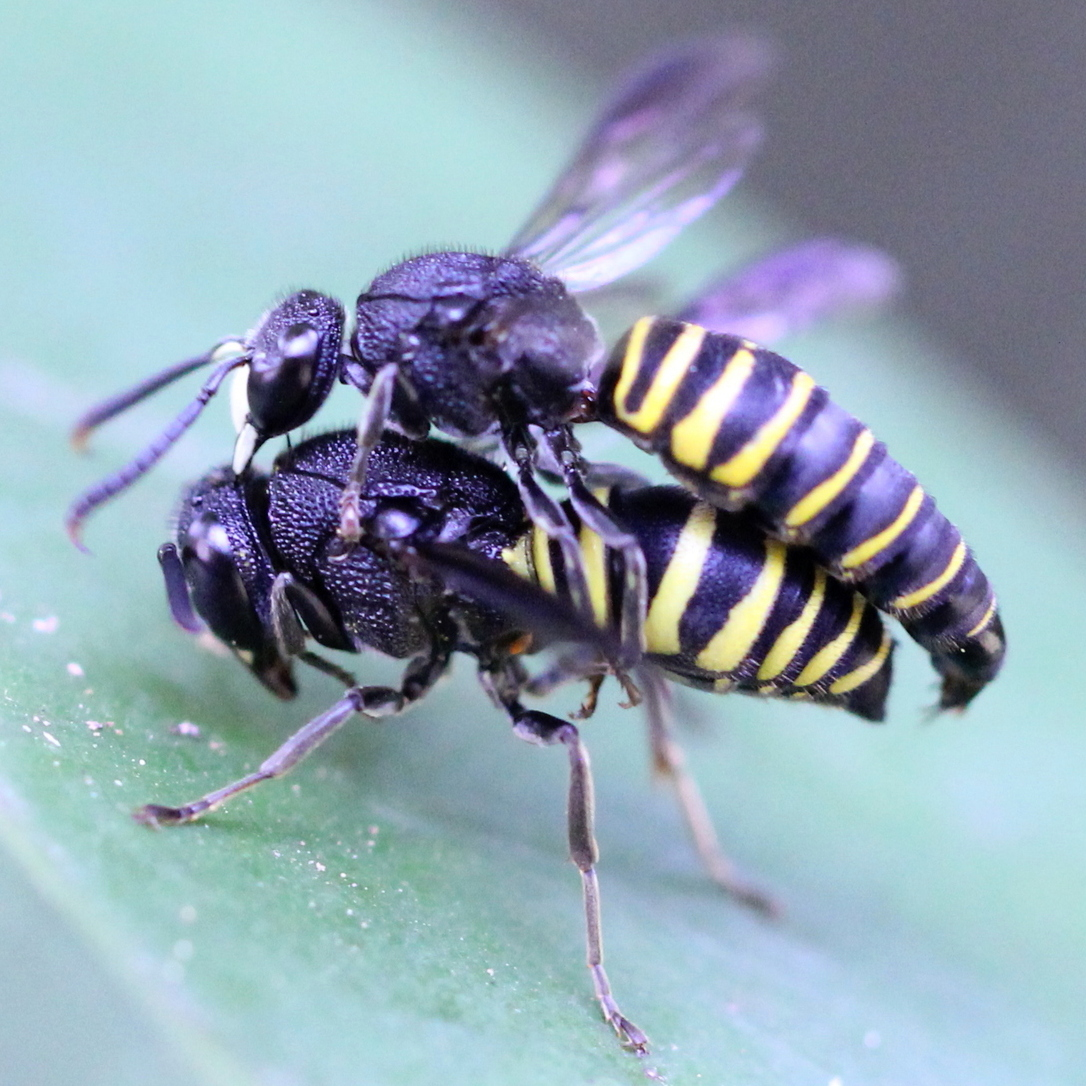
Lissodynerus septemfasciatus feanus

Lissodynerus is an Indomalayan and Australasian genus of potter wasps. The following species are classified under Lissodynerus:

- Lissodynerus agilis (Smith, 1858)
- Lissodynerus ater Giordani Soika, 1995
- Lissodynerus celebensis Selis, 2017
- Lissodynerus desaussurei Borsato, 2003
- Lissodynerus duplofasciatus (Schulthess, 1934)
- Lissodynerus impulsus (Smith, 1865)
- Lissodynerus kurandensis Giordani Soika, 1995
- Lissodynerus laminiger (Gribodo, 1891)
- Lissodynerus nigripennis Giordani Soika, 1993
- Lissodynerus niveatus Giordani Soika, 1994
- Lissodynerus pallidus Giordani Soika, 1995
- Lissodynerus philippinensis (Schulthess, 1913)
- Lissodynerus rutlandicus Kumar, Srinivasan & Carpenter, 2015
- Lissodynerus septemfasciatus (Smith, 1858)
- Lissodynerus simillimus Giordani Soika, 1995
- Lissodynerus Solomon Giordani Soika, 1995
- Lissodynerus trilaminatus Giordani Soika, 1995
- Lissodynerus vespoides (Williams, 1919)
- Lissodynerus wilhelmi Giordani Soika, 1996
