= Archancistrocerus =

Scientific classification
- Kingdom: Animalia
- Phylum: Arthropoda
- Class: Insecta
- Order: Hymenoptera
- Family: Vespidae
- Subfamily: Eumeninae
- Genus: Archancistrocerus; Giordani Soika, 1986
- Species: A. diffinis

Binomial name
- Archancistrocerus diffinis Giordani Soika, 1986

Genus of wasps

Archancistrocerus is a monotypic genus of potter wasps. The only species is Archancistrocerus diffinis.
