= Raphiglossoides =

Scientific classification
- Domain: Eukaryota
- Kingdom: Animalia
- Phylum: Arthropoda
- Class: Insecta
- Order: Hymenoptera
- Family: Vespidae
- Subfamily: Eumeninae
- Genus: Raphiglossoides; Giordani Soika, 1936

Type species
- Raphiglossoides aethiopicus Giordani Soika, 1936

Species
- Raphiglossoides aethiopicus Giordani Soika, 1936; Raphiglossoides minutus (Gusenleitner, 2000)

Genus of wasps

Raphiglossoides is a small genus of afrotropical potter wasps known from South Africa. Only two species are currently known.

Gusenleitner described Raphiglossoides minutus as Gibbodynerus minutus.
