= Brachypipona =

Scientific classification
- Domain: Eukaryota
- Kingdom: Animalia
- Phylum: Arthropoda
- Class: Insecta
- Order: Hymenoptera
- Family: Vespidae
- Subfamily: Eumeninae
- Genus: Brachypipona; Gusenleitner, 1967

Species
- Brachypipona grata (Kurzenko, 1977); Brachypipona hispanica (Giordani Soika, 1973); Brachypipona laticeps (Moravitz, 1895); Brachypipona longicornis (Moravitz, 1895); Brachypipona orientalis Gusenleitner, 2004; Brachypipona schlaeflei Gusenleitner, 2001; Brachypipona schmidti Gusenleitner, 1967

Genus of wasps

Brachypipona is a palearctic genus of potter wasps.
