= Diemodynerus =

Scientific classification
- Domain: Eukaryota
- Kingdom: Animalia
- Phylum: Arthropoda
- Class: Insecta
- Order: Hymenoptera
- Family: Vespidae
- Subfamily: Eumeninae
- Genus: Diemodynerus; Giordani Soika, 1962

Species
- See text

Genus of wasps

Diemodynerus is an Australasian genus of potter wasps. It contains the following species:

- Diemodynerus corvinus Borsato, 2005
- Diemodynerus decipiens (Saussure, 1867)
- Diemodynerus didjeridus Borsato, 2005
- Diemodynerus diemensis (Saussure, 1853)
- Diemodynerus nigroflavus Borsato, 2005
- Diemodynerus pseudacarodynerus Giordani Soika, 1961
- Diemodynerus saucius (Saussure, 1856)
- Diemodynerus tinypilpus Borsato, 2005
