= Cephalodynerus =

- Cephalodynerus deformiceps

Scientific classification
- Kingdom: Animalia
- Phylum: Arthropoda
- Clade: Pancrustacea
- Class: Insecta
- Order: Hymenoptera
- Family: Vespidae
- Subfamily: Eumeninae
- Genus: Cephalodynerus; Parker, 1965

Species
- Cephalodynerus deformiceps (Bohart, 1942); Cephalodynerus longissimus Gusenleitner, 1995; Cephalodynerus platycerus (Bohart, 1942); Cephalodynerus russipes (Bohart, 1942); Cephalodynerus sculleni Parker, 1964; Cephalodynerus unicornis Parker, 1964

Genus of wasps

Cephalodynerus is a nearctic genus of potter wasps with six species.
