= Rugomenes =

Scientific classification
- Domain: Eukaryota
- Kingdom: Animalia
- Phylum: Arthropoda
- Class: Insecta
- Order: Hymenoptera
- Family: Vespidae
- Genus: Rugomenes; Giordani Soika, 1992
- Species: R. rugifrons

Binomial name
- Rugomenes rugifrons (Cameron 1903)

Genus of wasps

Rugomenes is a monotypic Indomalayan genus of potter wasps containing a single species, Rugomenes rugifrons.
