= Pararhaphidoglossa =

Scientific classification
- Domain: Eukaryota
- Kingdom: Animalia
- Phylum: Arthropoda
- Class: Insecta
- Order: Hymenoptera
- Family: Vespidae
- Subfamily: Eumeninae
- Genus: Pararhaphidoglossa; Schulthess, 1910

Type species
- Pararhaphidoglossa fulva Schulthess, 1910

Species
- Pararhaphidoglossa adulescentula; Pararhaphidoglossa bicarinata; Pararhaphidoglossa chibchasa; Pararhaphidoglossa clypeolaris; Pararhaphidoglossa colorata; Pararhaphidoglossa confluenta; Pararhaphidoglossa cressoniana; Pararhaphidoglossa duckei; Pararhaphidoglossa fulva; Pararhaphidoglossa fulvoides; Pararhaphidoglossa gibbiventris; Pararhaphidoglossa gribodoi; Pararhaphidoglossa imitatrix; Pararhaphidoglossa invenusta; Pararhaphidoglossa mestiza; Pararhaphidoglossa minidenticulata; Pararhaphidoglossa nigrofulva; Pararhaphidoglossa nortoniana; Pararhaphidoglossa pluviosa; Pararhaphidoglossa proxima; Pararhaphidoglossa subtruncatula; Pararhaphidoglossa tinctura

Genus of wasps

Pararhaphidoglossa is a moderately diverse neotropical genus of potter wasps.
