= Megaodynerus =

Scientific classification
- Domain: Eukaryota
- Kingdom: Animalia
- Phylum: Arthropoda
- Class: Insecta
- Order: Hymenoptera
- Family: Vespidae
- Genus: Megaodynerus; Gusenleitner, 2012
- Species: M. maximus

Binomial name
- Megaodynerus maximus Gusenleitner, 2012

Genus of wasps

Megaodynerus is a monotypic indomalayan genus of potter wasps. The only known species, Megaodynerus maximus, was described from Laos.
