= Globepipona =

Scientific classification
- Domain: Eukaryota
- Kingdom: Animalia
- Phylum: Arthropoda
- Class: Insecta
- Order: Hymenoptera
- Family: Vespidae
- Subfamily: Eumeninae
- Genus: Globepipona; Gusenleitner, 1998

Species
- Globepipona zairensis Gusenleitner, 1998

Genus of wasps

Globepipona is an afrotropical genus of potter wasps with a single species, Globepipona zairensis.
