= Brachyodynerus =

Scientific classification
- Domain: Eukaryota
- Kingdom: Animalia
- Phylum: Arthropoda
- Class: Insecta
- Order: Hymenoptera
- Family: Vespidae
- Subfamily: Eumeninae
- Genus: Brachyodynerus; Blüthgen, 1938

Species
- Brachyodynerus binominatus Blüthgen, 1939; Brachyodynerus chloroticus Gusenleitner, 2004; Brachyodynerus djebaili Giordani Soika, 1983; Brachyodynerus kopetdagicus (Kostylev, 1940); Brachyodynerus kusdasi Gusenleitner, 1967; Brachyodynerus magnificus (Moravitz, 1867); Brachyodynerus perrarus Kurzenko, 1977; Brachyodynerus quadrimaculatus (Andre 1884); Brachyodynerus zhelochovtzewi (Kostylev, 1929)

Genus of insects

Brachyodynerus is a palearctic genus of potter wasps.
