= Carinstrocerus =

Scientific classification
- Domain: Eukaryota
- Kingdom: Animalia
- Phylum: Arthropoda
- Class: Insecta
- Order: Hymenoptera
- Family: Vespidae
- Subfamily: Eumeninae
- Genus: Carinstrocerus; Giordani Soika, 1989

Species
- Carinstrocerus dolorans (Giordani Soika, 1935); Carinstrocerus hilaris Giordani Soika, 1989

Genus of wasps

Carinstrocerus is an Afrotropical genus of potter wasps.
