= Cyphodynerus =

Scientific classification
- Domain: Eukaryota
- Kingdom: Animalia
- Phylum: Arthropoda
- Class: Insecta
- Order: Hymenoptera
- Family: Vespidae
- Subfamily: Eumeninae
- Genus: Cyphodynerus; Vecht, 1971

Genus of wasps

Cyphodynerus is an Afrotropical and Palearctic genus of potter wasps. It contains the following species:

- Cyphodynerus bisellatus (Schulthess, 1914)
- Cyphodynerus canaliculatus (Saussure, 1856)
- Cyphodynerus guillarmodi Giordani Soika, 1985
- Cyphodynerus kimberleyensis Giordani Soika, 1985
- Cyphodynerus rubroniger (Bingham, 1902)
- Cyphodynerus salekanus (Strand, 1922)
- Cyphodynerus sculpturatus (Dover, 1925)
