= Lamellodynerus =

Scientific classification
- Domain: Eukaryota
- Kingdom: Animalia
- Phylum: Arthropoda
- Class: Insecta
- Order: Hymenoptera
- Family: Vespidae
- Genus: Lamellodynerus; Gusenleitner, 1999
- Species: L. nigrofulvus

Binomial name
- Lamellodynerus nigrofulvus Gusenleitner, 1999

Genus of wasps

Lamellodynerus is an Afrotropical genus of potter wasps with a single species Lamellodynerus nigrofulvus from the Ivory Coast.
