= Tropidodynerus =

Scientific classification
- Domain: Eukaryota
- Kingdom: Animalia
- Phylum: Arthropoda
- Class: Insecta
- Order: Hymenoptera
- Family: Vespidae
- Subfamily: Eumeninae
- Genus: Tropidodynerus; Blüthgen, 1939

Type species
- Tropidodynerus interruptus (Brullé, 1832)

Species
- Tropidodynerus fertoni (Dusmet, 1925); Tropidodynerus flavus (Lepeletier, 1841); Tropidodynerus fraternus (Bingham, 1897); Tropidodynerus hostis (Nurse, 1903); Tropidodynerus interruptus (Brullé, 1832)

Genus of wasps

Tropidodynerus is a Palearctic and Indomalayan genus of potter wasps.
