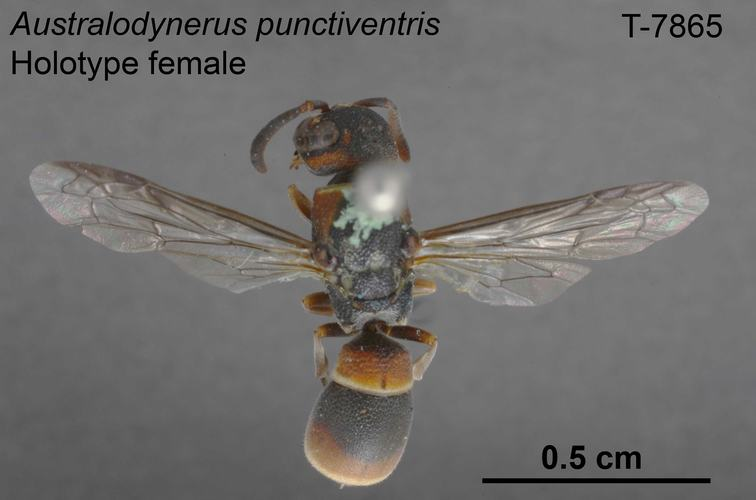
- mounted specimen of Australodynerus punctiventris holotype from the Victoria Museum

Scientific classification
- Kingdom: Animalia
- Phylum: Arthropoda
- Clade: Pancrustacea
- Class: Insecta
- Order: Hymenoptera
- Family: Vespidae
- Subfamily: Eumeninae
- Genus: Australodynerus; Giordani Soika, 1962

Type species
- Odynerus pusillus de Saussure 1856

Species
- see text

= Australodynerus =

Genus of wasps

Australodynerus is an Australasian genus of potter wasps.

== Taxonomy ==
Australodynerus Was first described as a genus in 1962 by the Italian entomologist Antonio Giordani Soika with Odynerus pusillus, which had been described in 1856 by the Swiss entomologist Henri Louis Frédéric de Saussure, as its type species. The genus is classified within the tribe Odynerini in the subfamily Eumeninae, the potter wasps, part of the family Vespidae.

== Species ==
The following species are classified within the Australodynerus:

- Australodynerus bennettensis Borsato, 1996
- Australodynerus convexus Giordani Soika, 1977
- Australodynerus flavoniger Giordani Soika, 1977
- Australodynerus longicornis Borsato, 1996
- Australodynerus merredinensis Giordani Soika, 1977
- Australodynerus punctiventris Giordani Soika, 1977
- Australodynerus pusilloides Giordani Soika, 1962
- Australodynerus pusillus (de Saussure, 1856)
- Australodynerus rubignosus Borsato, 1996
- Australodynerus unipunctatus Giordani Soika, 1993
- Australodynerus yanchepensis Giordani Soika, 1962

== Characteristics ==
Australodynerus potter wasps are medium sized. They have an elongate mesosoma which is not quite cylindrical as it has a slight depression on the dorsal surface and it is slightly wider at the front than the rear. The postscutellum, has a short, horizontal surface dorsal which is not obviously separate from the angled posterior surface, which is part of the rear surface of the mesosoma.the proposed is elongated, flattened and has its dorsal surface extending onto its rear surface. There are well developed ridges along the sides and these are create right angles or acute angles where they join the lower ridges. The first tergite is wide and domed, as is the second but to a much lesser extent.

== Distribution ==
Australodynerus potter wasps are endemic to Australia.
