= Acanthodynerus =

Scientific classification
- Kingdom: Animalia
- Phylum: Arthropoda
- Class: Insecta
- Order: Hymenoptera
- Family: Vespidae
- Subfamily: Eumeninae
- Genus: Acanthodynerus; Gusenleitner, 1969

Species
- Acanthodynerus giordanii; Acanthodynerus multimaculatus

Genus of wasps

Acanthodynerus is a genus of potter wasps.
