= Hemipterochilis =

Scientific classification
- Domain: Eukaryota
- Kingdom: Animalia
- Phylum: Arthropoda
- Class: Insecta
- Order: Hymenoptera
- Family: Vespidae
- Subfamily: Eumeninae
- Genus: Hemipterochilis

Genus of wasps

Hemipterochilis is a genus of potter wasps.

== Species ==
There are at least three species:

- Hemipterochilus moricei (Schulthess, 1923)
- Hemipterochilus notula (Lepeletier, 1841) – NW Africa
- Hemipterochilis rubriventris Gusenleitner, 1998 – Morocco
