= Stenosigma =

Scientific classification
- Domain: Eukaryota
- Kingdom: Animalia
- Phylum: Arthropoda
- Class: Insecta
- Order: Hymenoptera
- Family: Vespidae
- Subfamily: Eumeninae
- Genus: Stenosigma; Giordani Soika, 1978

Type species
- Stenosigma allegrum (Zavattari, 1912)

Species
- Stenosigma allegrum (Zavattari, 1912); Stenosigma humerale Giordani Soika, 1990; Stenosigma imitans (Ducke, 1911); Stenosigma mariae Ferreira & Hermes, 2018; Stenosigma panamense Ferreira & Hermes, 2018; Stenosigma quechua Hermes & Ferreira, 2016; Stenosigma testaceum (Fox, 1899)

Genus of wasps

Stenosigma is a small Neotropical genus of potter wasps.
