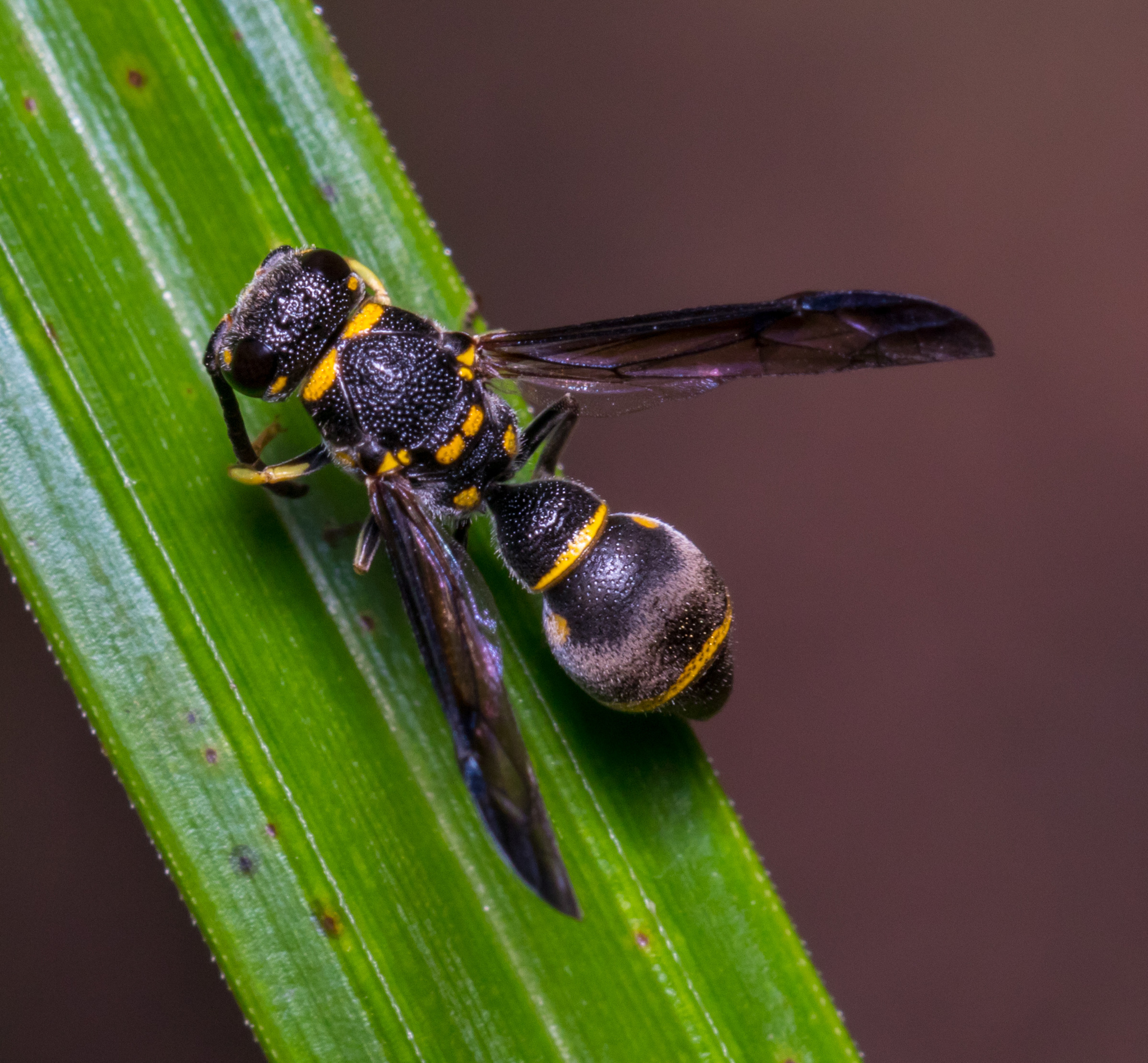
- Apodynerus formosensis

Scientific classification
- Kingdom: Animalia
- Phylum: Arthropoda
- Class: Insecta
- Order: Hymenoptera
- Family: Vespidae
- Subfamily: Eumeninae
- Genus: Apodynerus; Giordani Soika, 1993

Synonyms
- Philippodynerus Gusenleitner, 1996

= Apodynerus =

Genus of wasps

Apodynerus is an Indomalayan genus of potter wasps.
