= Malagassodynerus =

Scientific classification
- Domain: Eukaryota
- Kingdom: Animalia
- Phylum: Arthropoda
- Class: Insecta
- Order: Hymenoptera
- Family: Vespidae
- Genus: Malagassodynerus; Gusenleitner, 1992
- Species: M. scutellatus

Binomial name
- Malagassodynerus scutellatus Gusenleitner, 1992

Genus of wasps

Malagassodynerus is a monotypic genus of potter wasps endemic to Madagascar.
