= Leptomicrodynerus =

Scientific classification
- Domain: Eukaryota
- Kingdom: Animalia
- Phylum: Arthropoda
- Class: Insecta
- Order: Hymenoptera
- Family: Vespidae
- Genus: Leptomicrodynerus; Giordani Soika, 1985
- Species: L. tieshengi

Binomial name
- Leptomicrodynerus tieshengi Giordani Soika, 1985

Genus of wasps

Leptomicrodynerus is a monotypic Palearctic genus of potter wasps.
