= Nestocoelius =

Scientific classification
- Domain: Eukaryota
- Kingdom: Animalia
- Phylum: Arthropoda
- Class: Insecta
- Order: Hymenoptera
- Family: Vespidae
- Subfamily: Eumeninae
- Genus: Nestocoelius; Giordani Soika, 1992

Species
- Nestocoelius petiolatus (Smith, 1859)

Genus of wasps

Nestocoelius is a monotypic Australasian genus of potter wasps.
