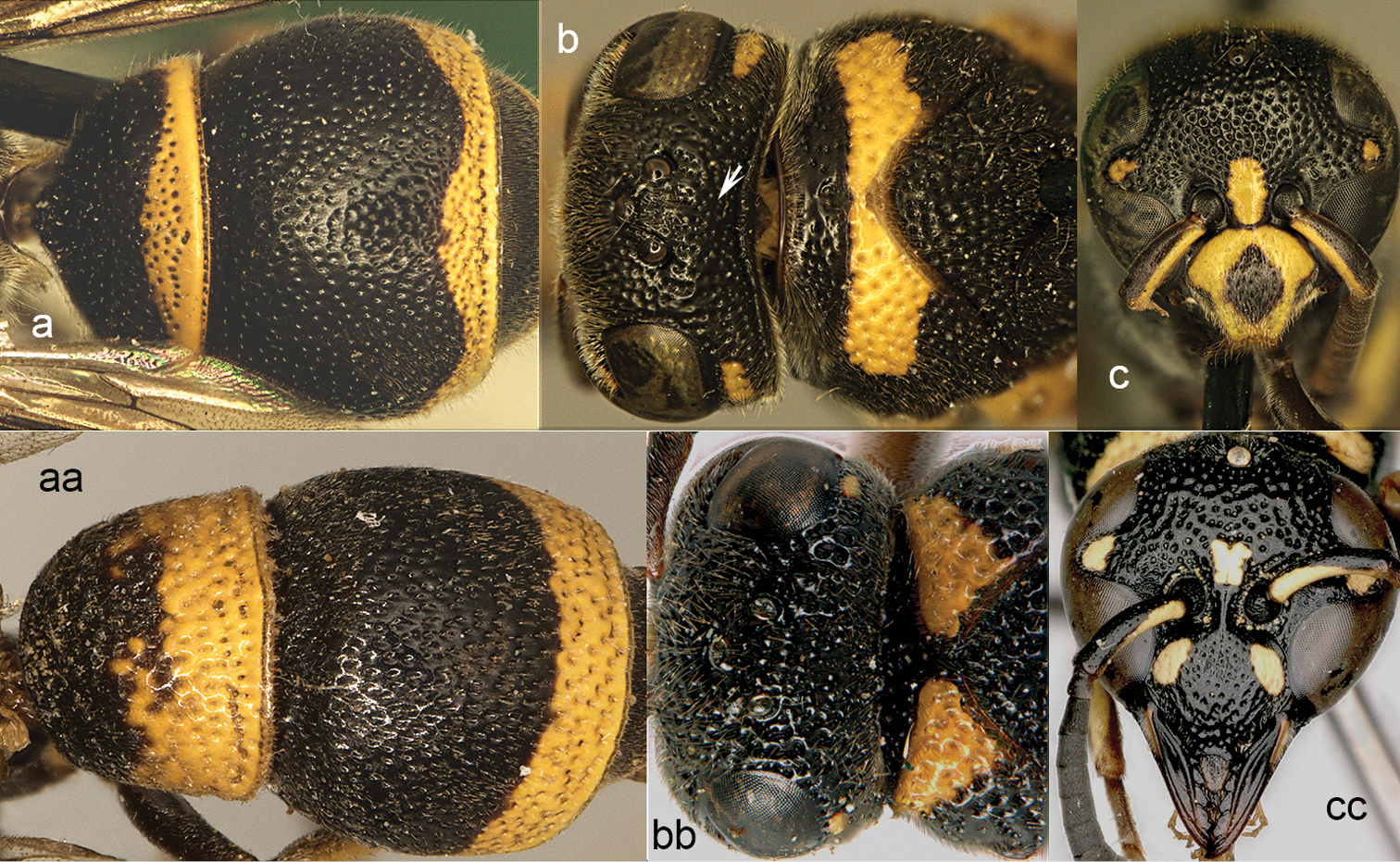

Scientific classification
- Domain: Eukaryota
- Kingdom: Animalia
- Phylum: Arthropoda
- Class: Insecta
- Order: Hymenoptera
- Family: Vespidae
- Subfamily: Eumeninae
- Genus: Paraleptomenes; Giordani Soika, 1970

Type species
- Paraleptomenes nurseanus Giordani Soika, 1970

= Paraleptomenes =

Genus of wasps

Paraleptomenes is a primarily Indomalayan genus of potter wasps. There is a single species, Paraleptomenes miniatus, reported outside of the region, from the island of Mauritius in the Afrotropical region.

== Species ==
Paraleptomenes contains the following eleven species:

- Paraleptomenes communis Giordani Soika, 1994
- Paraleptomenes darugiriensis Kumar, Carpenter & Sharma, 2014
- Paraleptomenes guichardi Giordani Soika, 1994
- Paraleptomenes humbertianus (Saussure, 1867)
- Paraleptomenes incultus Nguyen & Nguyen, 2020
- Paraleptomenes kosempoensis (Schulthess, 1934)
- Paraleptomenes miniatus (Saussure, 1855)
- Paraleptomenes nurseanus Giordani Soika, 1970
- Paraleptomenes rufoniger Giordani Soika, 1994
- Paraleptomenes setaceus Bai, Chen & Li, 2022
- Paraleptomenes transfoveolus Bai, Chen & Li, 2022
