= Gioiella (wasp) =

Scientific classification
- Domain: Eukaryota
- Kingdom: Animalia
- Phylum: Arthropoda
- Class: Insecta
- Order: Hymenoptera
- Family: Vespidae
- Subfamily: Eumeninae
- Genus: Gioiella; Giordano Soika, 1985

Type species
- Odynerus katonai Schulthess, 1913

Species
- Gioiella insecutor (Giordani Soika, 1951); Gioiella katonai (Schulthess, 1913); Gioiella kristenseni (Meade-Waldo, 1915)

Genus of wasps

Gioiella is an afrotropical genus of potter wasps with three described species.
