= Nirtenia =

Scientific classification
- Domain: Eukaryota
- Kingdom: Animalia
- Phylum: Arthropoda
- Class: Insecta
- Order: Hymenoptera
- Family: Vespidae
- Subfamily: Eumeninae
- Genus: Nirtenia; Giordani Soika, 1989

Species
- Nirtenia propodealis Giordani Soika, 1989

Genus of wasps

Nirtenia is an Afrotropical genus of potter wasps.
