= Plagiolabra =

Scientific classification
- Domain: Eukaryota
- Kingdom: Animalia
- Phylum: Arthropoda
- Class: Insecta
- Order: Hymenoptera
- Family: Vespidae
- Subfamily: Eumeninae
- Genus: Plagiolabra; Schulthess, 1903

Type species
- Plagiolabra nigra Schulthess, 1903

Species
- Plagiolabra andina Brèthes, 1906; Plagiolabra nigra Schulthess, 1903

Genus of wasps

Plagiolabra is a neotropical genus of potter wasps currently containing 2 species found in the Gran Chaco biogeographical province of central South America, in Argentina, Brazil and Paraguay.
