= Epiodynerus =

Scientific classification
- Domain: Eukaryota
- Kingdom: Animalia
- Phylum: Arthropoda
- Class: Insecta
- Order: Hymenoptera
- Family: Vespidae
- Subfamily: Eumeninae
- Genus: Epiodynerus; Giordani Soika, 1958
- Species: E. alecto

Binomial name
- Epiodynerus alecto (Lepeletier, 1841)

Genus of wasps

Epiodynerus is a monotypic genus of potter wasps. The sole species is Epiodynerus alecto.
