= Afrodynerus =

Scientific classification
- Kingdom: Animalia
- Phylum: Arthropoda
- Clade: Pancrustacea
- Class: Insecta
- Order: Hymenoptera
- Family: Vespidae
- Subfamily: Eumeninae
- Genus: Afrodynerus; Soika, 1934

Species
- Afrodynerus monstruosus

Genus of wasps

Afrodynerus is an afrotropical genus of potter wasps.
