= Orientalicesa =

Scientific classification
- Domain: Eukaryota
- Kingdom: Animalia
- Phylum: Arthropoda
- Class: Insecta
- Order: Hymenoptera
- Family: Vespidae
- Subfamily: Eumeninae
- Genus: Orientalicesa; Koçak & Kemal, 2010

Type species
- Odynerus (Lionotus) unifasciatus Schulthess, 1934 (= Orientalicesa confasciata Tan & Carpenter, 2018)

Synonyms
- Kennethia Giordani Soika, 1994; Kennetia Giordani Soika, 1994

Genus of wasps

Orientalicesa is a small Indomalayan genus of potter wasps.

== Taxonomy ==
The genus was first described under the name Kennethia by Antonio Giordani Soika, who misspelled the name as Kennetia in his original description of the genus. As the generic name was already preoccupied by Kennethia De Deckker, 1979, a genus of Crustacea in the family Notodromadidae, the replacement name of Orientalicesa was designated by Koçak and Kemal in 2010. In that work the newly proposed genus name was not explicitly given a gender, but their list of recombinations had adjectival names consistently formed as feminine, so the genus is feminine under ICZN Article 30.2.3. However, some later authors have spelled some names as if the genus were masculine.

== Species ==
- Orientalicesa bicolorata (Giordani Soika, 1995)
- Orientalicesa confasciata Tan & Carpenter, 2018
- Orientalicesa inversa (Giordani Soika, 1995)
- Orientalicesa javana (Giordani Soika, 1995)
- Orientalicesa multicincta (Giordani Soika, 1995)
- Orientalicesa nigra Li, Barthélémy & Carpenter, 2019
- Orientalicesa sabahensis (Giordani Soika, 1995)
