= Omicrabulus =

Scientific classification
- Domain: Eukaryota
- Kingdom: Animalia
- Phylum: Arthropoda
- Class: Insecta
- Order: Hymenoptera
- Family: Vespidae
- Subfamily: Eumeninae
- Genus: Omicrabulus; Giordani Soika, 1987

Type species
- Labus saganensis Giordani Soika, 1944

Species
- See text

Genus of wasps

Omicrabulus is an Afrotropical genus of potter wasps.

== Species ==
The following species are placed in the genus Omicrabulus:

- Omicrabulus admonitor Giordani Soika, 1989
- Omicrabulus arabicus Gusenleitner, 2002
- Omicrabulus baidoensis Giordani Soika, 1989
- Omicrabulus punctatissimus Gusenleitner, 2000
- Omicrabulus saganensis (Giordani Soika, 1944)
- Omicrabulus triangularis (Giordani Soika, 1944)
