= Hirtocoelius =

Scientific classification
- Domain: Eukaryota
- Kingdom: Animalia
- Phylum: Arthropoda
- Class: Insecta
- Order: Hymenoptera
- Family: Vespidae
- Genus: Hirtocoelius; Giordani Soika, 1992
- Species: H. aureoniger

Binomial name
- Hirtocoelius aureoniger (Giordani Soika, 1958)

Genus of wasps

Hirtocoelius is a monotypic Australasian genus of potter wasps. The sole species is Hirtocoelius aureoniger.
