= Pirhosigma =

Scientific classification
- Domain: Eukaryota
- Kingdom: Animalia
- Phylum: Arthropoda
- Class: Insecta
- Order: Hymenoptera
- Family: Vespidae
- Subfamily: Eumeninae
- Genus: Pirhosigma; Giordani Soika, 1978

Type species
- Pirhosigma simulans (Saussure, 1875)

Species
- Pirhosigma aenigmaticum; Pirhosigma deforme; Pirhosigma limpidum; Pirhosigma mearimense; Pirhosigma pilosum; Pirhosigma simulans; Pirhosigma superficiale

Genus of wasps

Pirhosigma is a moderately small Neotropical genus of potter wasps.
