= Pseudochilus =

Scientific classification
- Domain: Eukaryota
- Kingdom: Animalia
- Phylum: Arthropoda
- Class: Insecta
- Order: Hymenoptera
- Family: Vespidae
- Subfamily: Eumeninae
- Genus: Pseudochilus; Saussure, 1856

Type species
- Pseudochilus glabripalpis (Saussure, 1852)

Species
- Pseudochilus asmarensis Giordani Soika, 1936; Pseudochilus botswanensis Giordani Soika, 1987; Pseudochilus glabripalpis (Saussure, 1852); Pseudochilus tricolor Giordani Soika, 1987; Pseudochilus versicolor (Schulthess, 1914)

Genus of wasps

Pseudochilus is a small Afrotropical genus of potter wasps consisting of 5 currently known species.
