= Lissepipona =

Scientific classification
- Domain: Eukaryota
- Kingdom: Animalia
- Phylum: Arthropoda
- Class: Insecta
- Order: Hymenoptera
- Family: Vespidae
- Genus: Lissepipona; Giordani Soika, 1994
- Species: L. variabilis

Binomial name
- Lissepipona variabilis Giordani Soika, 1994

Genus of wasps

Lissepipona is a monotypic Indomalayan genus of potter wasps. Its single species (Lissepipona variabilis) is known from Sulawesi.
