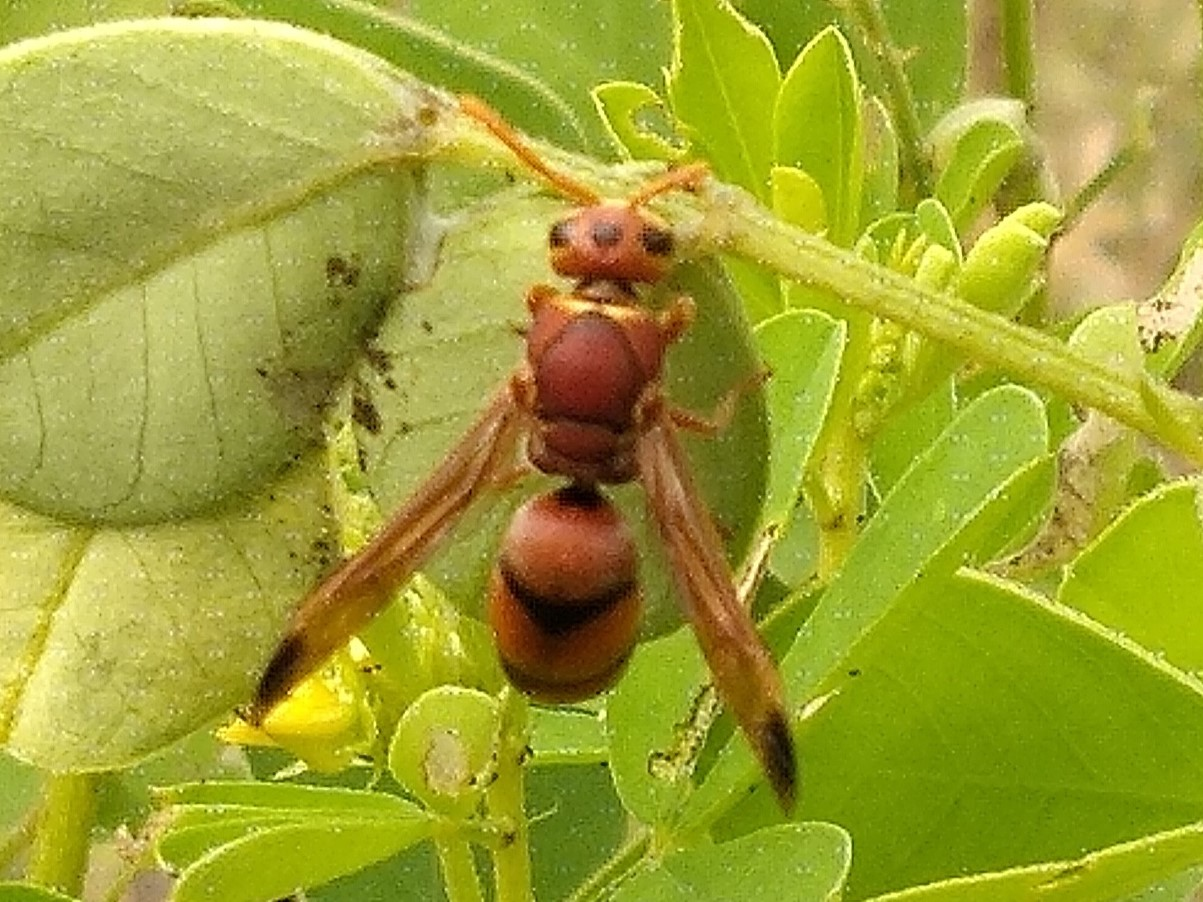
- Antodynerus limbatus

Scientific classification
- Domain: Eukaryota
- Kingdom: Animalia
- Phylum: Arthropoda
- Class: Insecta
- Order: Hymenoptera
- Family: Vespidae
- Subfamily: Eumeninae
- Genus: Antodynerus; Saussure, 1855

Species
- Antodynerus oppugnator; Antodynerus proterreus; Antodynerus punctatipennis; Antodynerus radialis; Antodynerus scottianus; Antodynerus sheffieldi; Antodynerus signiferus; Antodynerus somalicus; Antodynerus spoliatus; Antodynerus stevensonianus; Antodynerus stiraspis; Antodynerus thomensis; Antodynerus wellmani; Antodynerus wellmanoides

= Antodynerus =

Genus of wasps

Antodynerus is an Afrotropical and Indomalayan genus of potter wasps.
