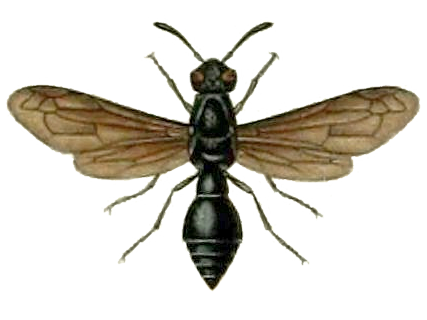
- Montezumia platinia

Scientific classification
- Kingdom: Animalia
- Phylum: Arthropoda
- Clade: Pancrustacea
- Class: Insecta
- Order: Hymenoptera
- Family: Vespidae
- Subfamily: Eumeninae
- Genus: Montezumia; Saussure, 1852

Type species
- Montezumia rufidentata Saussure, 1852

Species
- see text

= Montezumia =

Genus of hymenopterans

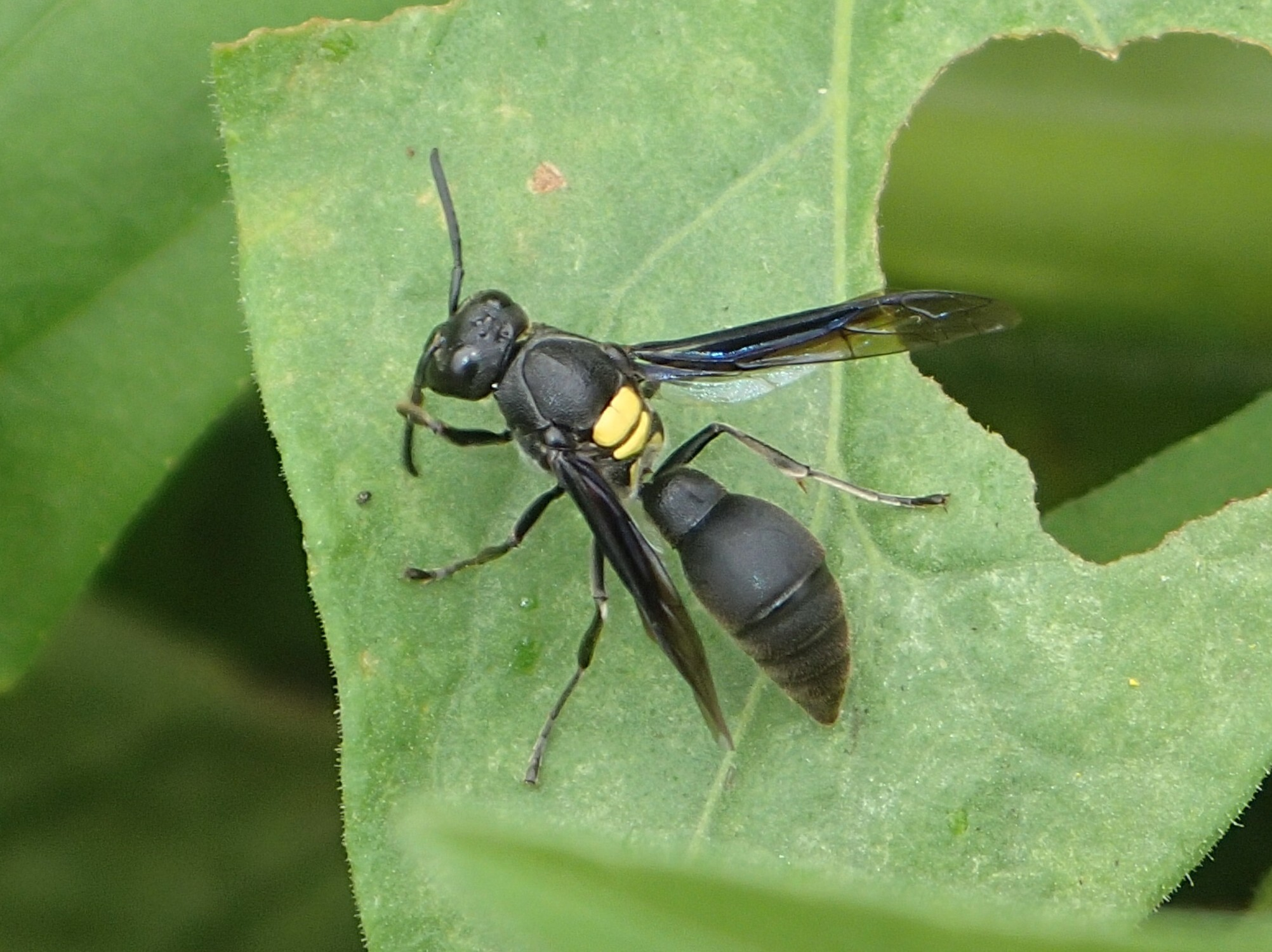
Montezumia pelagica. Ecuador

Montezumia is a primarily neotropical genus of eumenine wasps whose 48 species (Willink 1982) range from Argentina to the southwestern United States (Arizona). Most of the known species (38 of 52 species and subspecies; Willink 1982) are from South America. Unfortunately, the behaviour of Montezumia species has been described for only eight definitively identified species (ferruginea, dimidiata, cortesioides, vechti, pelagica, brethesi, platinia, and petiolata) (reviewed in Willink 1982).

The genus is specially interesting for illuminating the origins of group life and eusociality (social behaviour characterized by a reproductive division of labor between egg-laying queens and sterile workers). Montezumia belongs to a vespid subfamily (Eumeninae) of primarily solitary wasps which are closely related to the eusocial vespids of the subfamilies Epiponinae and Polistinae

== Species ==
The following species are classified within the genus Montezumia:

- Montezumia analis
- Montezumia anceps
- Montezumia arizonensis
- Montezumia aurata
- Montezumia azteca
- Montezumia azurescens
- Montezumia bequaerti
- Montezumia brethesi
- Montezumia bruchii
- Montezumia coeruleorufa
- Montezumia colombiana
- Montezumia cortesia
- Montezumia cortesioides
- Montezumia difficilis
- Montezumia dimidiata
- Montezumia duckei
- Montezumia ferruginea
- Montezumia fritzi
- Montezumia grossa
- Montezumia holmbergii
- Montezumia huasteca
- Montezumia ignobiloides
- Montezumia ignota
- Montezumia infernalis
- Montezumia insolita
- Montezumia koenigsmanni
- Montezumia leprieurii
- Montezumia liliacea
- Montezumia liliaciosa
- Montezumia marthae
- Montezumia melas
- Montezumia mexicana
- Montezumia morosa
- Montezumia nigra
- Montezumia nigriceps
- Montezumia nigroflava
- Montezumia nitida
- Montezumia oaxaca
- Montezumia obscura
- Montezumia pelagica
- Montezumia petiolata
- Montezumia platinia
- Montezumia simulatrix
- Montezumia soikai
- Montezumia sparsa
- Montezumia trinitata
- Montezumia termitophila
- Montezumia variegata
- Montezumia vechti
