= Trachyodynerus =

Scientific classification
- Domain: Eukaryota
- Kingdom: Animalia
- Phylum: Arthropoda
- Class: Insecta
- Order: Hymenoptera
- Family: Vespidae
- Subfamily: Eumeninae
- Genus: Trachyodynerus; Giordani Soika, 1989
- Species: T. sauditus

Binomial name
- Trachyodynerus sauditus Giordani Soika, 1989

Genus of wasps

Trachyodynerus is a monotypic genus of potter wasps known from Saudi Arabia. The sole species is Trachyodynerus sauditus.
