= Aruodynerus =

Scientific classification
- Kingdom: Animalia
- Phylum: Arthropoda
- Class: Insecta
- Order: Hymenoptera
- Family: Vespidae
- Subfamily: Eumeninae
- Genus: Aruodynerus; Giordani Soika, 1993

Genus of wasps

Aruodynerus is an Australasian genus of potter wasps known from the Aru islands and New Guinea.

There are two species assigned to this genus:

- Aruodynerus aruanus (Gribodo, 1891)
- Aruodynerus excellens Giordani Soika, 1993
