= Postepipona =

Scientific classification
- Kingdom: Animalia
- Phylum: Arthropoda
- Clade: Pancrustacea
- Class: Insecta
- Order: Hymenoptera
- Family: Vespidae
- Subfamily: Eumeninae
- Genus: Postepipona; Giordani Soika, 1974

Type species
- Postepipona socotrae Giordani Soika, 1974

Species
- Postepipona andreanicolor Gusenleitner, 2011; Postepiona socotrae Giordani Soika, 1974

Synonyms
- Simplepipona

Genus of wasps

Postepipona is an Afrotropical genus of potter wasps containing two species, one from Madagascar and the other from island of Socotra in Yemen.
