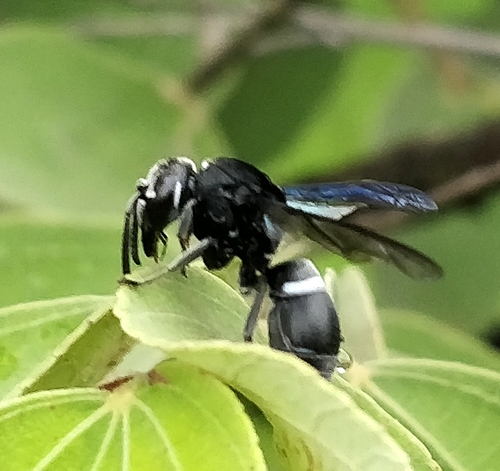
- Indodynerus capitatus

Scientific classification
- Domain: Eukaryota
- Kingdom: Animalia
- Phylum: Arthropoda
- Class: Insecta
- Order: Hymenoptera
- Family: Vespidae
- Genus: Indodynerus; Gusenleitner, 2008
- Species: I. capitatis

Binomial name
- Indodynerus capitatis Gusenleitner, 2008

= Indodynerus =

Genus of wasps

Indodynerus is a monotypic genus of potter wasps known from India and Pakistan with a single described species Indodynerus capitatus.
