= Rhynchalastor =

Scientific classification
- Domain: Eukaryota
- Kingdom: Animalia
- Phylum: Arthropoda
- Class: Insecta
- Order: Hymenoptera
- Family: Vespidae
- Subfamily: Eumeninae
- Genus: Rhynchalastor; Meade-Waldo, 1910

Type species
- Rhynchalastor fuscipennis Meade-Waldo, 1910

Species
- See text

Genus of wasps

Rhynchalastor is a moderately large afrotropical genus of potter wasps with 25 species currently known. Some authorities expand the genus to include species otherwise classified under related genera such as Stenodynerus

== Species ==
Some of the Afrotropical species classified under Rhynchalastor are listed below:

- Rhynchalastor auratipennis (Giordani Soika, 1934)
- Rhynchalastor auratus (Fabricius, 1787)
- Rhynchalastor baidoensis (Giordani Soika, 1944)
- Rhynchalastor bairstowi (Gribodo, 1892)
- Rhynchalastor bensoni (Giordani Soika, 1934)
- Rhynchalastor captiosus (Giordani Soika, 1989)
- Rhynchalastor carinatus (Gusenleitner, 2006)
- Rhynchalastor caudalis (Giordani Soika, 1934)
- Rhynchalastor corvus (Meade-Waldo, 1915)
- Rhynchalastor ferruginatus (Bequaert, 1918)
- Rhynchalastor flavofasciatellus (Giordani Soika, 1940)
- Rhynchalastor flavofasciatus (Gusenleitner, 2006)
- Rhynchalastor flavotorquatus (Giordani Soika, 1940)
- Rhynchalastor fuscipennis (Meade-Waldo, 1910)
- Rhynchalastor histrionimimus (Bequaert, 1918)
- Rhynchalastor imitator (Giordani Soika, 1983)
- Rhynchalastor indotatus (Giordani Soika, 1934)
- Rhynchalastor kolensis (Giordani Soika, 1934)
- Rhynchalastor luteatus(Gusenleitner, 2006)
- Rhynchalastor lutra (Giordani Soika, 1934)
- Rhynchalastor miserrimus (Giordani Soika, 1934)
- Rhynchalastor occidentalis (Giordani Soika, 1989)
- Rhynchalastor politiclypeus (von Schulthess, 1914)
- Rhynchalastor rhizophorarum (Bequaert, 1918)
- Rhynchalastor sorex (Gusenleitner, 2006)
- Rhynchalastor xanthosoma (Schletterer, 1891)
