= Jucancistrocerus =

Scientific classification
- Domain: Eukaryota
- Kingdom: Animalia
- Phylum: Arthropoda
- Class: Insecta
- Order: Hymenoptera
- Family: Vespidae
- Subfamily: Eumeninae
- Genus: Jucancistrocerus; Blüthgen, 1938

Type species
- Odynerus jucundus Mocsary, 1883

Species
- See text

Genus of wasps

Jucancistrocerus is a Palearctic genus of potter wasps. The currently species assigned to Jucancistrocerus are:

- Jucancistrocerus alashanicus Kurzenko, 1977
- Jucancistrocerus angustifrons (Kostylev, 1940)
- Jucancistrocerus atrofasciatus (Moravitz, 1885)
- Jucancistrocerus caspicus Giordani Soika, 1970
- Jucancistrocerus chotanensis (Blüthgen, 1942)
- Jucancistrocerus citreodecoratus Giordani Soika, 1970
- Jucancistrocerus consimilis (Moravitz, 1895)
- Jucancistrocerus inusiatus Gusenleitner, 1999
- Jucancistrocerus jucundus (Mocsáry, 1883)
- Jucancistrocerus lepidus Gusenleitner, 1972
- Jucancistrocerus minutepunctatus Giordani Soika, 1970
- Jucancistrocerus pareumeniformis Giordani Soika, 1973
- Jucancistrocerus saharensis (Giordani Soika, 1934)
- Jucancistrocerus subnitens (Moravitz, 1895)
- Jucancistrocerus tachkendensis (Dalla Torre, 1889)
