= Tricarinodynerus =

Scientific classification
- Domain: Eukaryota
- Kingdom: Animalia
- Phylum: Arthropoda
- Class: Insecta
- Order: Hymenoptera
- Family: Vespidae
- Subfamily: Eumeninae
- Genus: Tricarinodynerus; Giordani Soika, 1952

Type species
- Tricarinodynerus guerinii (Saussure, 1853)

Species
- Tricarinodynerus abreptus (Giordani Soika, 1934); Tricarinodynerus anceps (Gribodo, 1891); Tricarinodynerus arabicus Guichard, 1986; Tricarinodynerus bequaerti Schout., 1919; Tricarinodynerus guerinii (Saussure, 1852); Tricarinodynerus magretti (Gribodo, 1884); Tricarinodynerus obscurus (Gusenleitner, 2007); Tricarinodynerus prominens (Giordani Soika, 1937); Tricarinodynerus rufoflavus (Giordani Soika, 1940); Tricarinodynerus schubotzianus (Schulthess, 1913); Tricarinodynerus ventralis (Saussure, 1890)

Genus of wasps

Tricarinodynerus is a genus of potter wasps known from the Afrotropical and Palearctic regions.
