= Okinawepipona =

Scientific classification
- Kingdom: Animalia
- Phylum: Arthropoda
- Class: Insecta
- Order: Hymenoptera
- Family: Vespidae
- Subfamily: Eumeninae
- Genus: Okinawepipona; Yamane, 1987

Species
- Okinawepipona kogimai (Giordani Soika, 1986); Okinawepipona curcipunctura Nguyen & Xu, 2014; Okinawepipona nigra Nguyen & Xu, 2014

Genus of wasps

Okinawepipona is a small genus consisting of three species of East Asian potter wasps.
