= Ubirodynerus =

Scientific classification
- Domain: Eukaryota
- Kingdom: Animalia
- Phylum: Arthropoda
- Class: Insecta
- Order: Hymenoptera
- Family: Vespidae
- Genus: Ubirodynerus; Borsato, 1994
- Species: U. excavatus

Binomial name
- Ubirodynerus excavatus Borsato, 1994

Genus of wasps

Ubirodynerus is a monotypic Australian genus of potter wasps. The sole species, Ubirodynerus excavatus, is regarded as a synonym of Delta excavata.
