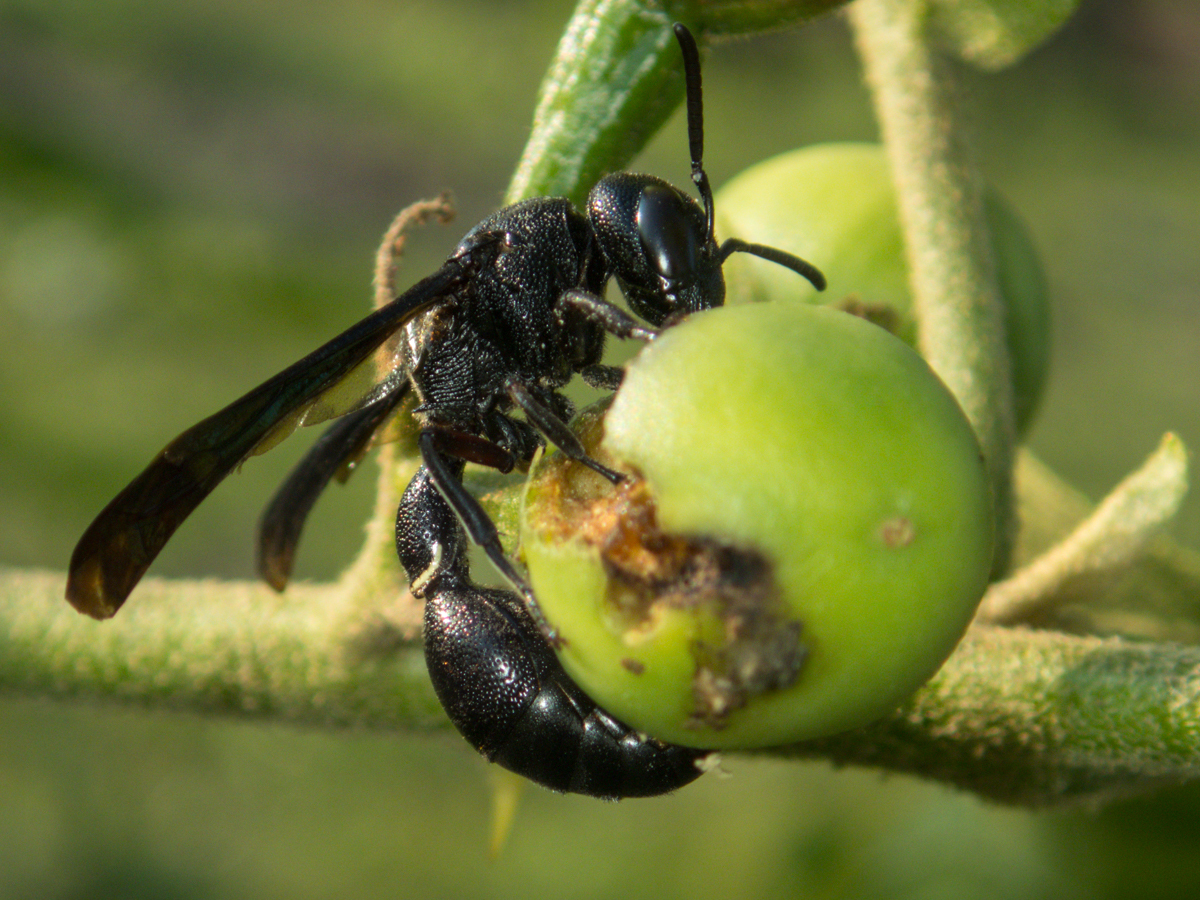

Scientific classification
- Kingdom: Animalia
- Phylum: Arthropoda
- Clade: Pancrustacea
- Class: Insecta
- Order: Hymenoptera
- Family: Vespidae
- Subfamily: Eumeninae
- Genus: Nortozumia; Vecht, 1937

Type species
- Zethus rufofemoratus Cameron, 1903

Species
- Nortozumia picea Vecht, 1963; Nortozumia pulchella (Smith, 1858); Nortozumia rufofemorata (Cameron, 1903)

= Nortozumia =

Genus of wasps

Nortozumia is an Indomalayan genus of potter wasps.
