= Leptodynerus =

Scientific classification
- Domain: Eukaryota
- Kingdom: Animalia
- Phylum: Arthropoda
- Class: Insecta
- Order: Hymenoptera
- Family: Vespidae
- Subfamily: Eumeninae
- Genus: Leptodynerus; Blüthgen, 1938

Species
- Leptodynerus arabicus Giordani Soika, 1970; Leptodynerus biskrensis Blüthgen, 1938

Genus of wasps

Leptodynerus is a palearctic genus of potter wasps.
