= Leptomenoides =

Scientific classification
- Kingdom: Animalia
- Phylum: Arthropoda
- Class: Insecta
- Order: Hymenoptera
- Family: Vespidae
- Subfamily: Eumeninae
- Genus: Leptomenoides

Species
- Leptomenoides cairnensis; Leptomenoides extraneus; Leptomenoides histrio; Leptomenoides mackayensis; Leptomenoides pachymeniformis; Leptomenoides placidior; Leptomenoides pronotalis

Genus of wasps

Leptomenoides is an Australasian genus of potter wasps.
