= Latimenes =

Scientific classification
- Domain: Eukaryota
- Kingdom: Animalia
- Phylum: Arthropoda
- Class: Insecta
- Order: Hymenoptera
- Family: Vespidae
- Genus: Latimenes; Giordani Soika, 1992
- Species: L. latipennis

Binomial name
- Latimenes latipennis (Smith, 1858)

Genus of wasps

Latimenes is a monotypic Indomalayan genus of potter wasps, the single species, Latimenes latipennis, was originally named by Frederick Smith in 1858 as Odynerus latipennis.
