= Pseudodontodynerus =

Scientific classification
- Domain: Eukaryota
- Kingdom: Animalia
- Phylum: Arthropoda
- Class: Insecta
- Order: Hymenoptera
- Family: Vespidae
- Subfamily: Eumeninae
- Genus: Pseudodontodynerus; Blüthgen, 1939

Type species
- Pseudodontodynerus pretiosus (Dusmet, 1928)

Species
- See text

Genus of wasps

Pseudodontodynerus is a genus of potter wasps distributed throughout the Palearctic, Indomalayan and Afrotropical regions.

== Species ==
The following species are classified as members of Pseudodontodynerus:

- Pseudodontodynerus brittoni Giordani Soika, 1957
- Pseudodontodynerus dunbrodyensis (Cameron, 1905)
- Pseudodontodynerus gambiensis (Meade-Waldo, 1915)
- Pseudodontodynerus karaikkalensis (Giordani Soika, 1981)
- Pseudodontodynerus novissimus Giordani Soika, 1982
- Pseudodontodynerus peculiariventris Giordani Soika, 1952
- Pseudodontodynerus pretiosus (Dusmet, 1928)
- Pseudodontodynerus schwarzi Gusenleitner, 2009
