= Pseudoleptochilus =

Scientific classification
- Domain: Eukaryota
- Kingdom: Animalia
- Phylum: Arthropoda
- Class: Insecta
- Order: Hymenoptera
- Family: Vespidae
- Subfamily: Eumeninae
- Genus: Pseudoleptochilus; Blüthgen, 1938

Type species
- Pseudoleptochilus frenchi (Dusmet, 1917)

Species
- Pseudoleptochilus asiaticus Giordani Soika, 1970; Pseudoleptochilus frenchi (Dusmet, 1917)

Genus of wasps

Pseudoleptochilus is a small Palearctic genus of potter wasps consisting of two species.
