= Interzumia =

Scientific classification
- Domain: Eukaryota
- Kingdom: Animalia
- Phylum: Arthropoda
- Class: Insecta
- Order: Hymenoptera
- Family: Vespidae
- Genus: Interzumia; Gusenleitner, 2002
- Species: I. rufonigra

Binomial name
- Interzumia rufonigra Gusenleitner, 2002

Genus of wasps

Interzumia is an afrotropical genus of potter wasps with a single species, Interzumia rufonigra.
