= Brachymenes =

Scientific classification
- Kingdom: Animalia
- Phylum: Arthropoda
- Class: Insecta
- Order: Hymenoptera
- Family: Vespidae
- Subfamily: Eumeninae
- Genus: Brachymenes; Giordani Soika, 1961

Species
- Brachymenes dyscherus (Saussure, 1852); Brachymenes wagnerianus (Saussure, 1875)

Genus of wasps

Brachymenes is a small neotropical genus of potter wasps currently containing two species, the primarily Andean species B. wagnerianus and the lowland species B. dyscherus.

The first wasp of this species was collected by the German natural scientist Moritz Wagner (born at Bayreuth, Bavaria, on 3 October 1813) during his expedition from Panama over Colombia to Ecuador between 1858 and 1859. The holotype specimen later was described by the nature scientist Henri de Saussure from Geneva, who named the new-found wasp Eumenes wagnerianus in honour of its finder. In 1961, the Italian biologist Antonio Giordano Soika, during his revision of the family Eumenidae, founded, at the 11th Congress of the Entomological Society in Vienna, the new genus Brachymenes and described the new species Brachymenes dyscherus.

Both species are potter wasps. Their nests consist of parallel combined compartments composed of fine clay material which is later covered by a "roof" made of a more grainy structured material, to cover the exact site of the breeding compartments. B. wagnerianus always constructs six compartments in a vertical row in only one layer, in a specific pattern, while B. dyscherus nests can be much more extensive and combine several layers of breeding chambers.

The species distribution is Panama, Colombia, Ecuador, Peru, and Venezuela for B. wagnerianus. B. dyscherus is described from Guayana, Brazil, Argentina, Paraguay, Bolivia, Ecuador, and Peru. Its appearance in Colombia is uncertain.
