= Pachyminixi =

Scientific classification
- Domain: Eukaryota
- Kingdom: Animalia
- Phylum: Arthropoda
- Class: Insecta
- Order: Hymenoptera
- Family: Vespidae
- Subfamily: Eumeninae
- Genus: Pachyminixi; Giordani Soika, 1978

Type species
- Pachyminixi sumichrasti (Saussure, 1875)

Species
- Pachyminixi arechavaletae; Pachyminixi brethesi; Pachyminixi bifasciatum; Pachyminixi joergenseni; Pachyminixi sumichrasti; Pachyminixi uruguyensis

Genus of wasps

Pachyminixi is a small southern Neotropical genus of potter wasps.
