= Pararrhynchium =

- ornatum

Scientific classification
- Kingdom: Animalia
- Phylum: Arthropoda
- Clade: Pancrustacea
- Class: Insecta
- Order: Hymenoptera
- Family: Vespidae
- Subfamily: Eumeninae
- Genus: Pararrhynchium; Saussure, 1855

Type species
- Pararrhynchium ornatum (Smith, 1852)

Species
- See text

Genus of wasps

Pararrhynchium is a Palearctic and Indomalayan genus of potter wasps. The genus Pararrhynchium belongs to the subfamily Eumeninae within the family Vespidae. Potter wasps in this group are generally known for their ability to construct nests from mud. The classification of Pararrhynchium relies on morphological characteristics that distinguish it from related genera.

== Species ==
The following species are currently classified in Pararrhynchium:

- Pararrhynchium ishigakiensis (Yasumatsu, 1933)
- Pararrhynchium oceanicum Sk. Yamane, 1990
- Pararrhynchium ornatum (Smith, 1852)
- Pararrhynchium paradoxum (Gussakovsky, 1933)
- Pararrhynchium sinense (Schulthess, 1913)
- Pararrhynchium smithii (Saussure, 1856)
- Pararrhynchium taiwanum Kim & Yamane, 2007
- Pararrhynchium tsunekii Tano & Yam., 1983
- Pararrhynchium unifasciatum Gusenleitner, 1998
