= Antepipona =

- Antepipona deflenda (video)

Scientific classification
- Domain: Eukaryota
- Kingdom: Animalia
- Phylum: Arthropoda
- Class: Insecta
- Order: Hymenoptera
- Family: Vespidae
- Subfamily: Eumeninae
- Genus: Antepipona; Saussure, 1855

Species
- over 150 species; see text

Genus of wasps

Antepipona is a palearctic, afrotropical and indomalayan genus of potter wasps.

== Species ==
- Antepipona aberrata
- Antepipona aequinoxialis
- Antepipona aestimabilis
- Antepipona alberti
- Antepipona albocincta
- Antepipona albomarginata
- Antepipona albomarginatus
- Antepipona albosignata
- Antepipona anonyma
- Antepipona aprica
- Antepipona arabica
- Antepipona arethusae
- Antepipona armata
- Antepipona asperategula
- Antepipona aurantiaca
- Antepipona barrei
- Antepipona bhutanensis
- Antepipona biarcuata
- Antepipona biguttata
- Antepipona bipustulata
- Antepipona bispinosa
- Antepipona brincki
- Antepipona brunneola
- Antepipona brunnipes
- Antepipona cabrerai
- Antepipona caelebs
- Antepipona cameroni
- Antepipona cariniceps
- Antepipona celonitiformis
- Antepipona ceylonica
- Antepipona chobauti
- Antepipona cingulifera
- Antepipona concors
- Antepipona conradsi
- Antepipona consentanea
- Antepipona convexiventris
- Antepipona cribrata
- Antepipona curialis
- Antepipona darfurensis
- Antepipona dauensis
- Antepipona declarata
- Antepipona defecta
- Antepipona deflenda
- Antepipona deflendiformis
- Antepipona defracta
- Antepipona dentella
- Antepipona dictatoria
- Antepipona dimorpha
- Antepipona doursii
- Antepipona empeyi
- Antepipona exaltata
- Antepipona excelsa
- Antepipona fatua
- Antepipona ferruginosa
- Antepipona fervida
- Antepipona fredens
- Antepipona frontalis
- Antepipona gibbosissima
- Antepipona glabrata
- Antepipona goniodes
- Antepipona guichardi
- Antepipona guineensis
- Antepipona gusenleitneri
- Antepipona guttata
- Antepipona hamoni
- Antepipona hansi
- Antepipona haryana
- Antepipona hessei
- Antepipona hispanica
- Antepipona hova
- Antepipona iconia
- Antepipona iconius
- Antepipona injucunda
- Antepipona insana
- Antepipona intricata
- Antepipona irakensis
- Antepipona jacoti
- Antepipona jocosa
- Antepipona karadgensis
- Antepipona karibae
- Antepipona kashmirensis
- Antepipona kassalensis
- Antepipona laevigata
- Antepipona lemuriensis
- Antepipona liberator
- Antepipona luzonensis
- Antepipona mamathensis
- Antepipona melanodonta
- Antepipona menkei
- Antepipona metatarsalis
- Antepipona metemmensis
- Antepipona minor
- Antepipona minutissima
- Antepipona monomotapa
- Antepipona montana
- Antepipona mucronata
- Antepipona nicotrae
- Antepipona nigricornis
- Antepipona nigrior
- Antepipona obesa
- Antepipona omanensis
- Antepipona orbata
- Antepipona orbitalis
- Antepipona ornaticaudis
- Antepipona osmania
- Antepipona ovalis
- Antepipona paglianoi
- Antepipona pakasae
- Antepipona paradeflenda
- Antepipona paralastoroides
- Antepipona penetrata
- Antepipona peregrinabunda
- Antepipona plurimaculata
- Antepipona pontebae
- Antepipona praeclara
- Antepipona prompta
- Antepipona pruthii
- Antepipona pseudosenex
- Antepipona pulchella
- Antepipona pulchellula
- Antepipona pulchripilosella
- Antepipona quadrituberculata
- Antepipona raffrayi
- Antepipona rikatlensis
- Antepipona romanoffi
- Antepipona rubicunda
- Antepipona rufescens
- Antepipona scutellaris
- Antepipona scuttelaris
- Antepipona senegalensis
- Antepipona sesquicincta
- Antepipona sexfasciata
- Antepipona seyrigi
- Antepipona shantungensis
- Antepipona siamensis
- Antepipona sibilans
- Antepipona signatus
- Antepipona silaos
- Antepipona solstitialis
- Antepipona specifica
- Antepipona specularis
- Antepipona squamigera
- Antepipona stevensoniana
- Antepipona sudanensis
- Antepipona tekensis
- Antepipona tenuis
- Antepipona thailandia
- Antepipona tricolorata
- Antepipona tropicalis
- Antepipona tunisiana
- Antepipona turbulenta
- Antepipona tydides
- Antepipona tylocifica
- Antepipona vaalensis
- Antepipona vagabunda
- Antepipona varentzowi
- Antepipona verhoeffi
- Antepipona vescovilis
- Antepipona villiersi
- Antepipona yemenensis
