= Cuyodynerus =

Scientific classification
- Domain: Eukaryota
- Kingdom: Animalia
- Phylum: Arthropoda
- Class: Insecta
- Order: Hymenoptera
- Family: Vespidae
- Subfamily: Eumeninae
- Genus: Cuyodynerus; Willink, 1968

Species
- Cuyodynerus cuyanus (Brethes, 1903); Cuyodynerus pullus Cooper, 2001

Genus of wasps

Cuyodynerus is a small Andean genus of potter wasps.
