= Antezumia =

Scientific classification
- Domain: Eukaryota
- Kingdom: Animalia
- Phylum: Arthropoda
- Class: Insecta
- Order: Hymenoptera
- Family: Vespidae
- Genus: Antezumia; Saussure, 1875
- Species: A. chalybea

Binomial name
- Antezumia chalybea (de Saussure, 1855)

Genus of wasps

Antezumia is a monospecific neotropical genus of potter wasps restricted to the Amazonian basin. The sole species is Antezumia chalybea.
