= Parodynerus =

Scientific classification
- Domain: Eukaryota
- Kingdom: Animalia
- Phylum: Arthropoda
- Class: Insecta
- Order: Hymenoptera
- Family: Vespidae
- Subfamily: Eumeninae
- Genus: Parodynerus; Saussure, 1855

Type species
- Parodynerus bicinctus (Fabricius, 1781)

Species
- Parodynerus bicinctus Fabricius, 1781; Parodynerus cheesmani Giordani Soika, 1957; Parodynerus mediocinctus Turner, 1919; Parodynerus nigropetiolatus Giordani Soika, 1957; Parodynerus quodi Yach., 1908); Parodynerus rufipes Guerin, 1831

Genus of wasps

Parodynerus is an Australian genus of potter wasps.
