= Intereuodynerus =

Scientific classification
- Domain: Eukaryota
- Kingdom: Animalia
- Phylum: Arthropoda
- Class: Insecta
- Order: Hymenoptera
- Family: Vespidae
- Subfamily: Eumeninae
- Genus: Intereuodynerus; Gusenleitner, 1997

Type species
- Intereuodynerus siegberti (Gusenleitner 1967)

Species
- Intereuodynerus siegberti (Gusenleitner 1967); Intereuodynerus fritzi Gusenleitner 1997; Intereuodynerus siamesicus (Gusenleitner 1996)

Genus of wasps

Intereuodynerus is a genus of potter wasps with two species (Intereuodynerus siegberti and Intereuodynerus fritzi) known from Syria, and a third one (Intereuodynerus siamesicus) from Thailand.
