= Flavoleptus =

Scientific classification
- Domain: Eukaryota
- Kingdom: Animalia
- Phylum: Arthropoda
- Class: Insecta
- Order: Hymenoptera
- Family: Vespidae
- Subfamily: Eumeninae
- Genus: Flavoleptus; Giordani Soika,1992
- Species: F. flavobalteatus

Binomial name
- Flavoleptus flavobalteatus (Cameron 1903)

Genus of wasps

Flavoleptus is a monotypic Indomalayan genus of potter wasps. The sole species is Flavoleptus flavobalteatus.
