= Hemipterochilus =

Scientific classification
- Domain: Eukaryota
- Kingdom: Animalia
- Phylum: Arthropoda
- Class: Insecta
- Order: Hymenoptera
- Family: Vespidae
- Subfamily: Eumeninae
- Genus: Hemipterochilus; Fenton, 1909

Type species
- Odynerus terricola Mocsary, 1883 as a synonym for Hemipterochilus bembeciformis terricola (Moscary, 1883)

Genus of wasps

Hemipterochilus is a Palearctic genus of potter wasps. It contains the following species:

- Hemipterochilus aberrans (Moravitz, 1885)
- Hemipterochilus bembeciformis (Morawitz, 1867)
- Hemipterochilus bicoloricornis (Giordani Soika, 1952)
- Hemipterochilus fairmairi (Saussure, 1853)
- Hemipterochilus hohlbecki (Kostylev, 1934)
- Hemipterochilus moricei (Schulthess, 1923)
- Hemipterochilus notula (Lepeletier, 1841)
- Hemipterochilus punctiventris (Moravitz, 1885)
- Hemipterochilus rubrosignatus (André, 1884)
- Hemipterochilus simplex Gusenleitner, 2000
