= Labochilus =

Scientific classification
- Domain: Eukaryota
- Kingdom: Animalia
- Phylum: Arthropoda
- Class: Insecta
- Order: Hymenoptera
- Family: Vespidae
- Subfamily: Eumeninae
- Genus: Labochilus; Blüthgen, 1939

Type species
- Pterochilus linguarius Saunders, 1905

Species
- See text

Genus of wasps

Labochilus is a Palearctic genus of potter wasps. It contains the following species:

- Labochilus bimaculatus Gusenleitner, 2001
- Labochilus canariensis (Giordani Soika, 1974)
- Labochilus felix Guichard, 1986
- Labochilus linguarius (E. Saunders, 1905)
- Labochilus orientalis Gusenleitner, 2001
- Labochilus pulawskyi Giordani Soika, 1970
- Labochilus rubriventris Gusenleitner, 2001
