= Cyrtalastor =

Scientific classification
- Kingdom: Animalia
- Phylum: Arthropoda
- Clade: Pancrustacea
- Class: Insecta
- Order: Hymenoptera
- Family: Vespidae
- Subfamily: Eumeninae
- Genus: Cyrtalastor; Giordani Soika, 1989
- Species: C. moruloides

Binomial name
- Cyrtalastor moruloides Giordani Soika, 1989

Genus of wasps

Cyrtalastor is a monotypic Afrotropical genus of potter wasps. The sole species is Cyrtalastor moruloides.
