= Dolichodynerus =

Scientific classification
- Domain: Eukaryota
- Kingdom: Animalia
- Phylum: Arthropoda
- Class: Insecta
- Order: Hymenoptera
- Family: Vespidae
- Subfamily: Eumeninae
- Genus: Dolichodynerus; Bohart, 1939

Species
- See text

Genus of wasps

Dolichodynerus is a nearctic genus of potter wasps. It contains the following species:

- Dolichodynerus tanynotus (Cameron, 1909)
- Dolichodynerus turgiceps (Bohart, 1939)
- Dolichodynerus vandykei Bohart, 1950
