= Elisella =

Scientific classification
- Domain: Eukaryota
- Kingdom: Animalia
- Phylum: Arthropoda
- Class: Insecta
- Order: Hymenoptera
- Family: Vespidae
- Subfamily: Eumeninae
- Genus: Elisella; Giordani Soika, 1974
- Species: E. linae

Binomial name
- Elisella linae Giordani Soika, 1974

Genus of wasps

Elisella is a monotypic South African genus of potter wasps. The sole species is Elisella linae.
