= Incodynerus =

Scientific classification
- Domain: Eukaryota
- Kingdom: Animalia
- Phylum: Arthropoda
- Class: Insecta
- Order: Hymenoptera
- Family: Vespidae
- Subfamily: Eumeninae
- Genus: Incodynerus; Willink, 1968

Type species
- Odynerus romandinus Saussure, 1853

Species
- Incodynerus alticola; Incodynerus ambiguus; Incodynerus coccineipes; Incodynerus fulvipennis; Incodynerus melanotrichus; Incodynerus moei; Incodynerus romandinus; Incodynerus tegularis; Incodynerus urubambae; Incodynerus vilcanotae

Genus of wasps

Incodynerus is an andean neotropical genus of potter wasps currently containing 10 recognized species.
