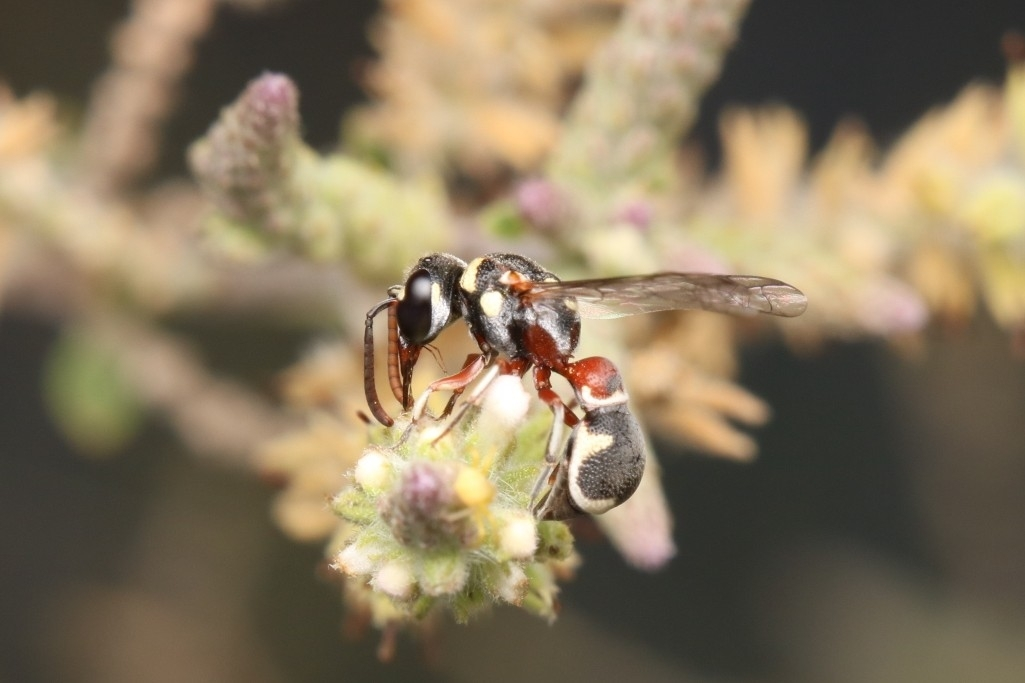

Scientific classification
- Domain: Eukaryota
- Kingdom: Animalia
- Phylum: Arthropoda
- Class: Insecta
- Order: Hymenoptera
- Family: Vespidae
- Subfamily: Eumeninae
- Genus: Maricopodynerus; Viereck, 1908

Type species
- Maricopodynerus maricoporum Viereck, 1908

Species
- Maricopodynerus arizonicus Bohart, 1988; Maricopodynerus chisosensis Bohart, 1950; Maricopodynerus decorabilis Bohart, 1950; Maricopodynerus differens Bohart, 1988; Maricopodynerus festivus Bohart, 1988; Maricopodynerus linsleyi Bohart, 1988; Maricopodynerus lissoides Bohart, 1989; Maricopodynerus lissus Bohart, 1950; Maricopodynerus maricoporum Viereck, 1908; Maricopodynerus optimus Bohart, 1988; Maricopodynerus permandibularis Bohart, 1948; Maricopodynerus pulvipilus Bohart, 1948; Maricopodynerus rudiceps Bohart, 1950; Maricopodynerus sericifrons Bohart, 1950; Maricopodynerus shannoni Bohart, 1950; Maricopodynerus sternalis Bohart, 1988

= Maricopodynerus =

Genus of potter wasps

Maricopodynerus is a Nearctic genus of potter wasps distributed west of the 100° western meridian in the United States and Mexico. The second metasomal segment, with its tergum much larger than its sternum is an outstanding characteristic of this genus.
