= Pseudosymmorphus =

Scientific classification
- Domain: Eukaryota
- Kingdom: Animalia
- Phylum: Arthropoda
- Class: Insecta
- Order: Hymenoptera
- Family: Vespidae
- Subfamily: Eumeninae
- Genus: Pseudosymmorphus; Blüthgen, 1938

Type species
- Pseudosymmorphus hindenburgi (Dusmet, 1917)

Species
- Pseudosymmorphus adnexus (Gusenleitner, 1969); Pseudosymmorphus hindenburgi (Dusmet, 1917); Pseudosymmorphus moricei (Schulthess, 1925); Pseudosymmorphus prophetus (Giordani Soika, 1952)

Genus of wasps

Pseudosymmorphus is a small Palearctic genus of potter wasps from North Africa and the Middle East, containing four species.
