= Paralionotulus =

Scientific classification
- Domain: Eukaryota
- Kingdom: Animalia
- Phylum: Arthropoda
- Class: Insecta
- Order: Hymenoptera
- Family: Vespidae
- Genus: Paralionotulus; Blüthgen, 1938
- Species: P. mervensis

Binomial name
- Paralionotulus mervensis (Radoszkowski, 1887)

Genus of wasps

Paralionotulus is a monotypic Palearctic genus of potter wasps, the sole species being Paralionotulus mervensis which was originally described in 1887 by the Polish entomologist Oktawiusz Radoszkowski as Leptochilus mervensis.
