= Convextrocerus =

Scientific classification
- Kingdom: Animalia
- Phylum: Arthropoda
- Clade: Pancrustacea
- Class: Insecta
- Order: Hymenoptera
- Family: Vespidae
- Subfamily: Eumeninae
- Genus: Convextrocerus; Giordani Soika 1989

Species
- Convextrocerus namibicus Gusenleitner, 2001; Convextrocerus nititissimus (Giordani Soika, 1936)

Genus of wasps

Convextrocerus is an African genus of potter wasps with two described species.
