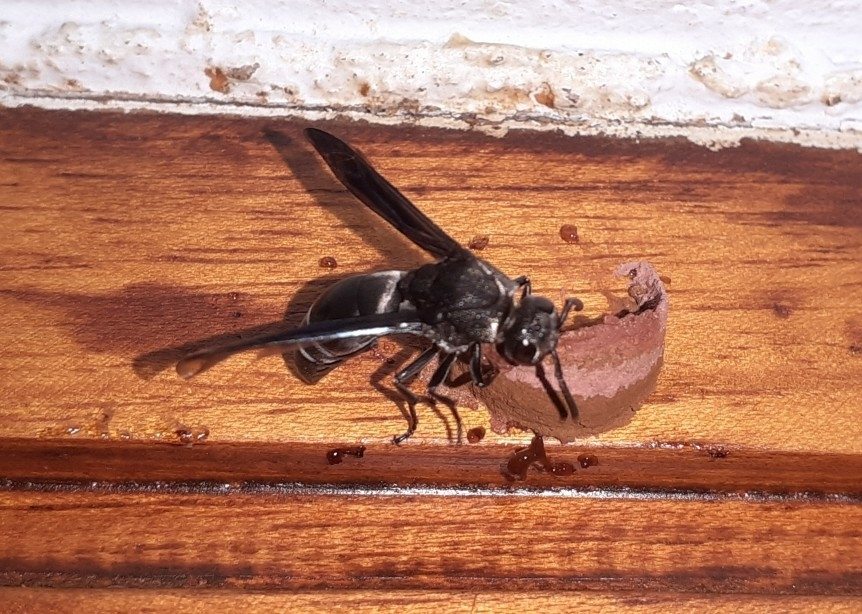
- Xenorhynchium nitidulum

Scientific classification
- Domain: Eukaryota
- Kingdom: Animalia
- Phylum: Arthropoda
- Class: Insecta
- Order: Hymenoptera
- Family: Vespidae
- Genus: Xenorhynchium; Vecht, 1963
- Species: X. nitidulum

Binomial name
- Xenorhynchium nitidulum (Fabricius, 1798)

= Xenorhynchium =

Genus of wasps

Xenorhynchium is a monotypic Indomalayan genus of potter wasps. The sole species is Xenorhynchium nitidulum.
