= Gastrodynerus =

Scientific classification
- Domain: Eukaryota
- Kingdom: Animalia
- Phylum: Arthropoda
- Class: Insecta
- Order: Hymenoptera
- Family: Vespidae
- Subfamily: Eumeninae
- Genus: Gastrodynerus; Bohart, 1984

Type species
- Stenodynerus vanduzeei Bohart, 1948

Species
- Gastrodynerus searsi Bohart, 1984; Gastrodynerus stangei Bohart, 1984; Gastrodynerus tacubayae (Saussure, 1857); Gastrodynerus vanduzeei (Bohart, 1948)

Genus of wasps

Gastrodynerus is a small south-western nearctic genus of potter wasps with four currently recognized species, all of them found in Mexico. Gastrodynerus vanduzeei is also found in the United States.
