= Paragymnomerus =

Scientific classification
- Domain: Eukaryota
- Kingdom: Animalia
- Phylum: Arthropoda
- Class: Insecta
- Order: Hymenoptera
- Family: Vespidae
- Subfamily: Eumeninae
- Genus: Paragymnomerus; Blüthgen, 1938

Type species
- Paragymnomerus spiricornis (Spinola, 1808)

Species
- Paragymnomerus amitinorum Blüthgen 1952; Paragymnomerus dusmeti Blüthgen, 1962; Paragymnomerus excelsus Kostylev, 1935; Paragymnomerus mammillatus (Moravitz, 1885); Paragymnomerus signaticollis (Moravitz, 1883); Paragymnomerus spiricornis (Spinola, 1808); Paragymnomerus spiricorniformis (Bialicky-Birola, 1926)

Genus of wasps

Paragymnomerus is a palearctic genus of potter wasps.
