= Gamma (wasp) =

Scientific classification
- Kingdom: Animalia
- Phylum: Arthropoda
- Clade: Pancrustacea
- Class: Insecta
- Order: Hymenoptera
- Family: Vespidae
- Subfamily: Eumeninae
- Genus: Gamma; Zavattari, 1912

Type species
- Pachymenes ventricosa Saussure, 1852

Species
- Gamma bogotense (Zavattari, 1912); Gamma bolivianum Giordani Soika, 1990; Gamma gulielmi Cooper, 1999; Gamma iuquipa Cooper, 1999; Gamma saussurei (Zavattari, 1912); Gamma ventricosum (Saussure, 1852)

Genus of wasps

Gamma is a small neotropical, primarily northern Andean genus of potter wasps currently containing 6 recognized species.
