= Leptochiloides =

Scientific classification
- Domain: Eukaryota
- Kingdom: Animalia
- Phylum: Arthropoda
- Class: Insecta
- Order: Hymenoptera
- Family: Vespidae
- Subfamily: Eumeninae
- Genus: Leptochiloides; Bohart, 1940

Type species
- Leptochiloides utahensis Bohart, 1940

Species
- Leptochiloides arizonae Bohart, 1940; Leptochiloides brevicornis Bohart, 1940; Leptochiloides utahensis Bohart, 1940

Genus of wasps

Leptochiloides is a small nearctic genus of potter wasps known from dry areas in South-Western North America. They have some structural similarities with members of the genus Pterocheilus, including the pilose labial palpi.
