= Gribodia =

Scientific classification
- Domain: Eukaryota
- Kingdom: Animalia
- Phylum: Arthropoda
- Class: Insecta
- Order: Hymenoptera
- Family: Vespidae
- Subfamily: Eumeninae
- Genus: Gribodia; Zavattari, 1912

Type species
- Monobia cavifrons Gribodo, 1891 synonym for Odynerus confluentus Smith, 1857.

Species
- See text

Genus of wasps

Gribodia is an Indomalayan genus of potter wasps. It contains the following species:

- Gribodia confluenta (Smith, 1857)
- Gribodia cupreipennis (Bingham, 1894)
- Gribodia guichardi Giordani Soika, 1974
- Gribodia javana Giordani Soika, 1974
- Gribodia punctatissima Giordani Soika, 1974
