= Parodontodynerus =

Scientific classification
- Domain: Eukaryota
- Kingdom: Animalia
- Phylum: Arthropoda
- Class: Insecta
- Order: Hymenoptera
- Family: Vespidae
- Subfamily: Eumeninae
- Genus: Parodontodynerus; Blüthgen, 1938

Type species
- Parodontodynerus ephippium (Klug, 1817)

Species
- Parodontodynerus aramaeus Blüthgen, 1955; Parodontodynerus ephippium (Klug, 1817); Parodontodynerus hauseri Gusenleitner, 1994; Parodontodynerus rufinus (Kostylev, 1940)

Genus of wasps

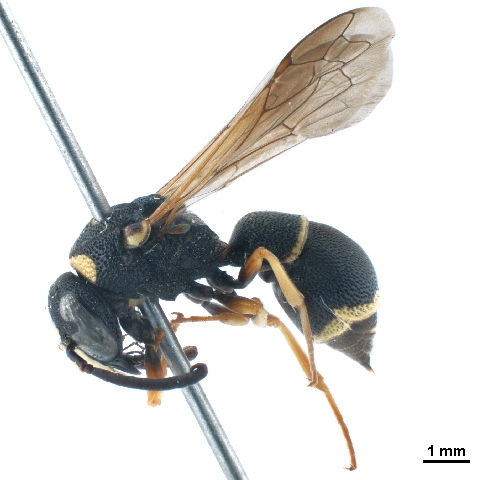

Parodontodynerus is a Palearctic genus of potter wasps.
