= Monodynerus =

Scientific classification
- Domain: Eukaryota
- Kingdom: Animalia
- Phylum: Arthropoda
- Class: Insecta
- Order: Hymenoptera
- Family: Vespidae
- Genus: Monodynerus; Gusenleitner, 1982
- Species: M. insimilis

Binomial name
- Monodynerus insimilis Gusenleitner, 1982

Genus of wasps

Monodynerus is a monotypic Palearctic genus of potter wasps.
