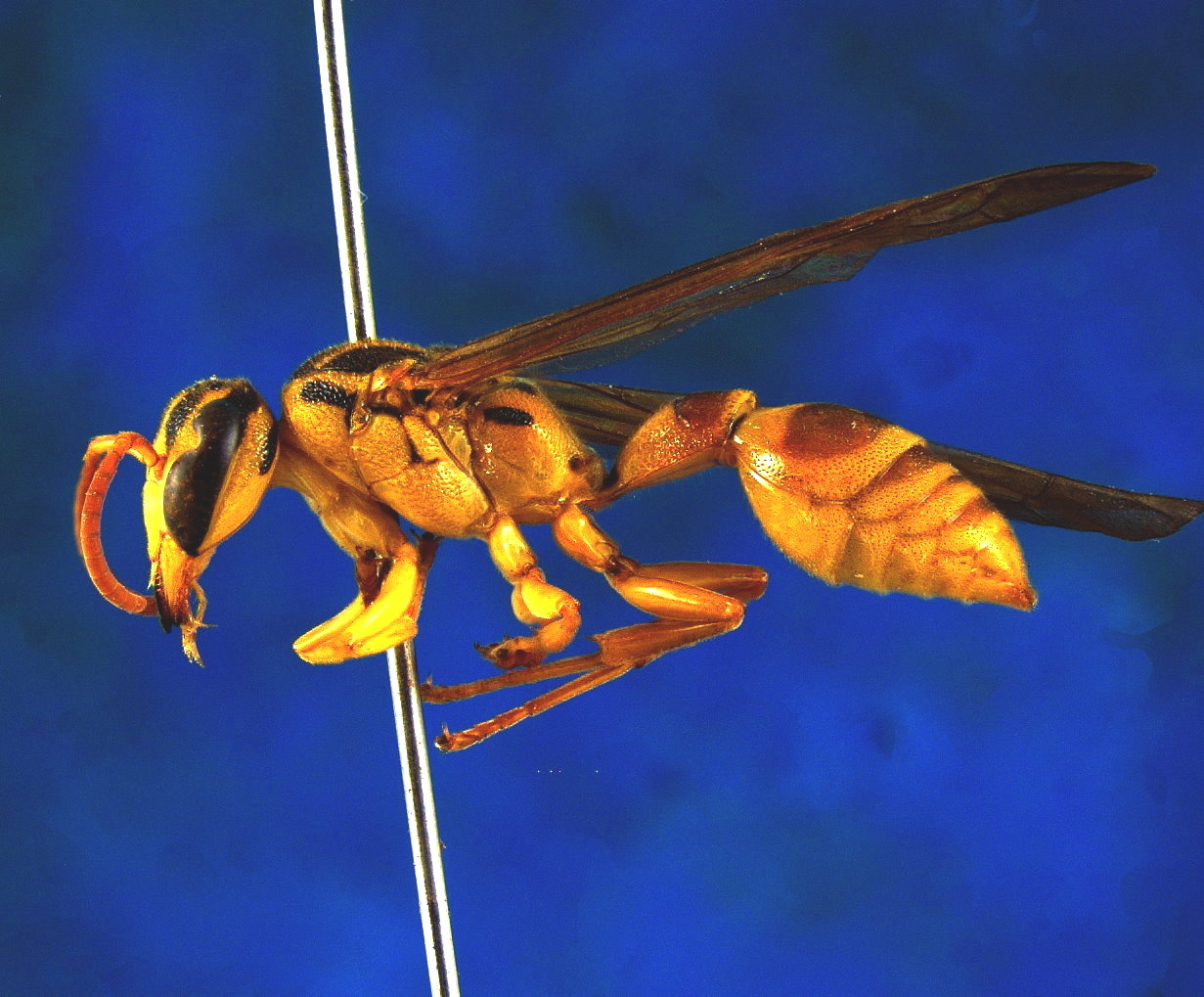
- Stenonartonia perdita Garcete-Barrett

Scientific classification
- Domain: Eukaryota
- Kingdom: Animalia
- Phylum: Arthropoda
- Class: Insecta
- Order: Hymenoptera
- Family: Vespidae
- Subfamily: Eumeninae
- Genus: Stenonartonia; Giordani Soika, 1974

Type species
- Stenonartonia polybioides (Schulthess, 1904)

Species
- Stenonartonia apicipennis (Fox, 1902); Stenonartonia cooperi Garcete-Barrett, 2011; Stenonartonia flavotestacea (Giordani Soika, 1941); Stenonartonia grossa Garcete-Barrett, 2011; Stenonartonia guaranitica (Bertoni, 1918); Stenonartonia guaraya Garcete-Barrett, 2011; Stenonartonia hasyva Garcete-Barrett, 2011; Stenonartonia hermetica Garcete-Barrett, 2011; Stenonartonia mimica (Kohl, 1907); Stenonartonia occipitalis Garcete-Barrett, 2011; Stenonartonia perdita Garcete-Barrett, 2011; Stenonartonia polybioides (Schulthess, 1904); Stenonartonia rejectoides Garcete-Barrett, 2011; Stenonartonia tanykaju Garcete-Barrett, 2011; Stenonartonia tekoraava Garcete-Barrett, 2014

= Stenonartonia =

Genus of wasps

Stenonartonia is a South American genus of potter wasps. The 15 known species of Stenonartonia are distributed across forested areas east of the Andes, with diversity concentrated on two areas: the Amazon basin and South-eastern Brazil. The distribution of Stenonartonia apicipennis seems to correspond with the distribution of the semideciduous dry forest system that crosses diagonally between the two above cited areas. Stenonartonia belongs to a group of genera with axillary fossa tending to be closed by the nearby structures. Those species in the group of Stenonartonia polybioides have further developed transparent pockets visible under the surface of the scutellum. Symbiotic mites get sheltered into those pockets and are sometimes visible under the cuticle.
