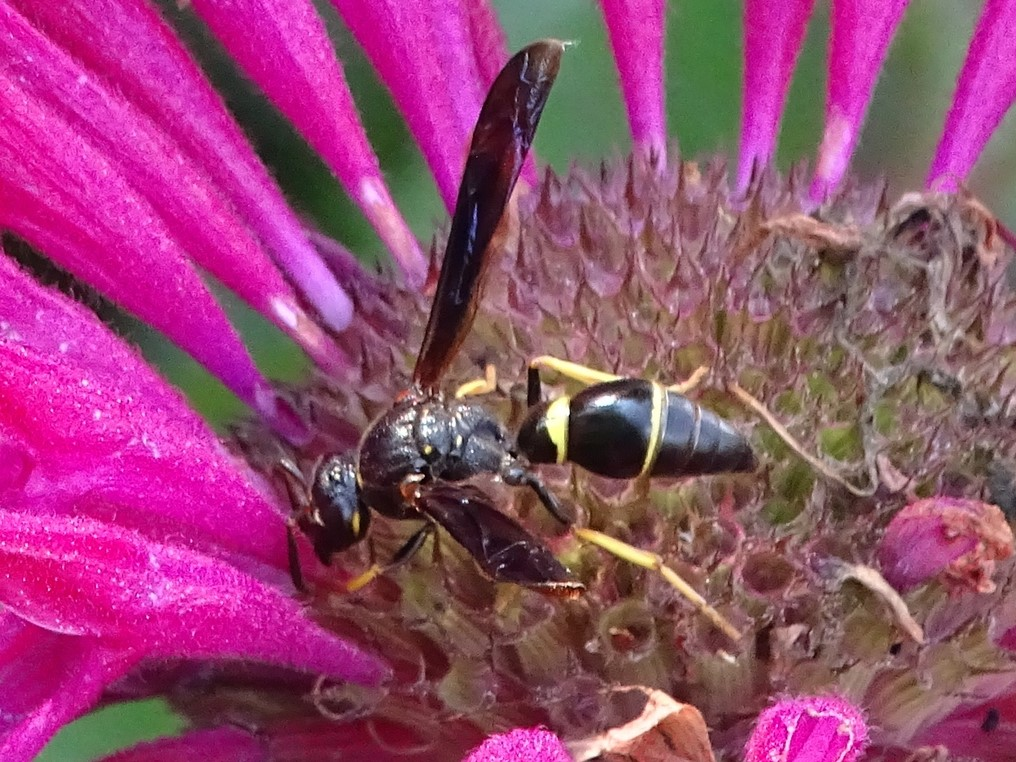
- Parazumia symmorpha

Scientific classification
- Domain: Eukaryota
- Kingdom: Animalia
- Phylum: Arthropoda
- Class: Insecta
- Order: Hymenoptera
- Family: Vespidae
- Subfamily: Eumeninae
- Genus: Parazumia; Saussure, 1855

Type species
- Parazumia carinulata ((Spinola, 1851)

Species
- Parazumia aliciae; Parazumia carinulata; Parazumia impunctata; Parazumia paranensis; Parazumia sulcata; Parazumia surinama; Parazumia symmorpha; Parazumia ticae; Parazumia tolteca; Parazumia yucateca

= Parazumia =

Genus of wasps

Parazumia is a Neotropical and Nearctic genus of medium to large sized potter wasps. The Nearctic species of this genus have been treated for much of the 20th century as a separate genus named Paranortonia.
