= Irianmenes =

Scientific classification
- Domain: Eukaryota
- Kingdom: Animalia
- Phylum: Arthropoda
- Class: Insecta
- Order: Hymenoptera
- Family: Vespidae
- Genus: Irianmenes; Giordani Soika, 1993
- Species: I. schneideri

Binomial name
- Irianmenes schneideri (Giordani Soika, 1943)

Genus of wasps

Irianmenes is a monotypic Australasian genus of potter wasps which was described in 1943 by the Italian entomologist Antonio Giordani Soika from specimens taken in Irian Jaya. The sole species is Irianmenes schneideri.
