= Eumicrodynerus =

Scientific classification
- Domain: Eukaryota
- Kingdom: Animalia
- Phylum: Arthropoda
- Class: Insecta
- Order: Hymenoptera
- Family: Vespidae
- Subfamily: Eumeninae
- Genus: Eumicrodynerus; Gusenleitner, 1972

Species
- Eumicrodynerus europaeus (Giordani Soika, 1942); Eumicrodynerus longicorpus Gusenleitner, 1976; Eumicrodynerus maroccanus (Giordani Soika, 1977)

Synonyms
- Symmorphoides

Genus of wasps

Eumicrodynerus is a small palearctic genus of potter wasps. Symmorphoides maroccanus was originally described by the Italian entomologist Antonio Giordani Soika in 1977 but this taxon was shown to be synonymous with Eumicrodynerus longicorpus. although E. longicorpus and E. maroccanus are still listed as separate species in some sources.
