= Chelodynerus =

Scientific classification
- Kingdom: Animalia
- Phylum: Arthropoda
- Clade: Pancrustacea
- Class: Insecta
- Order: Hymenoptera
- Family: Vespidae
- Subfamily: Eumeninae
- Genus: Chelodynerus; Perkins 1902

Species
- Chelodynerus chelifer Perkins, 1899

Genus of wasps

Chelodynerus is a monotypic genus of potter wasps which is found on Maui in Hawaii.
