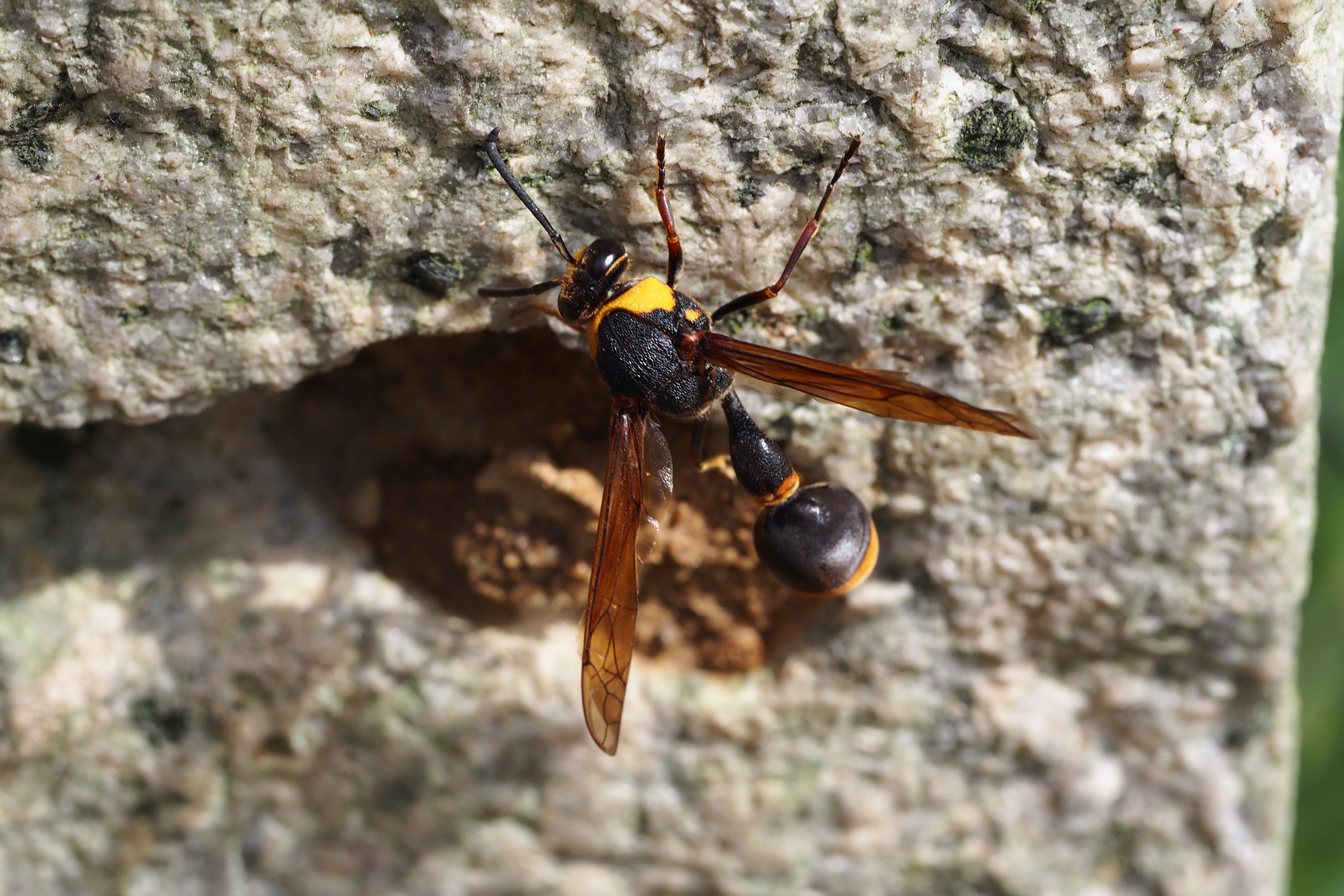
- Oreumenes decoratus

Scientific classification
- Domain: Eukaryota
- Kingdom: Animalia
- Phylum: Arthropoda
- Class: Insecta
- Order: Hymenoptera
- Family: Vespidae
- Subfamily: Eumeninae
- Genus: Oreumenes; Bequaert, 1926

Type species
- Oreumenes decoratus (Smith, 1852)

Species
- Oreumenes decoratus (Smith, 1852); synonim Oreumenes japonicus (de Saussure, 1858)

= Oreumenes =

Genus of wasps

Oreumenes is a monotypic genus of large Eumenes-like potter wasps. It occurs in China, Taiwan, Korea and Japan.

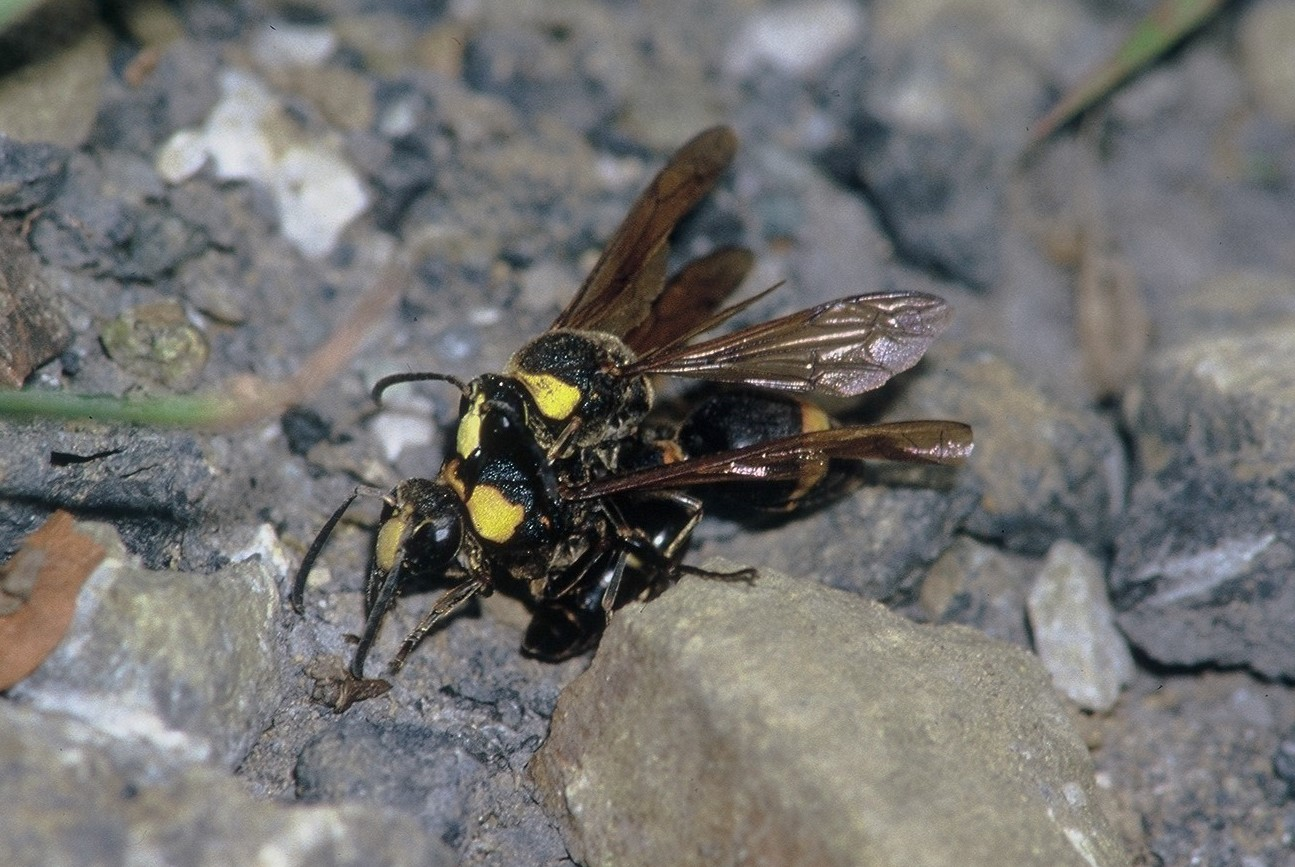
A male, top, captured a female for copulation.

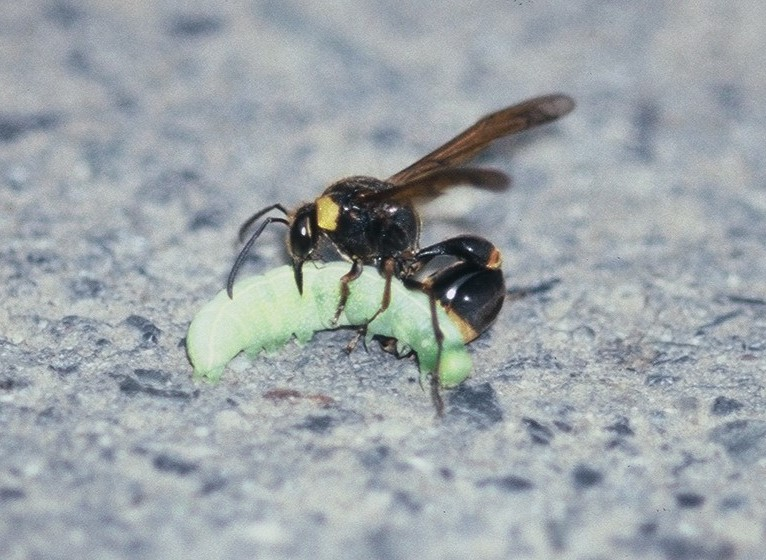
A female captured a caterpillar.
