= Pachymenes =

Scientific classification
- Domain: Eukaryota
- Kingdom: Animalia
- Phylum: Arthropoda
- Class: Insecta
- Order: Hymenoptera
- Family: Vespidae
- Subfamily: Eumeninae
- Genus: Pachymenes; Saussure, 1852

Type species
- Pachymenes sericeus Saussure, 1852

Species
- Pachymenes ater; Pachymenes aztecus; Pachymenes bipartitus; Pachymenes difficilis; Pachymenes ghilianii; Pachymenes laeviventris; Pachymenes obscurus; Pachymenes orellanae; Pachymenes picturatus; Pachymenes riograndensis; Pachymenes saussurei; Pachymenes sericeus; Pachymenes unicinctus

Genus of wasps

Pachymenes is a small but widely distributed Neotropical genus of potter wasps, it has been proposed that another Neotropical genus, Santamenes, be merged into Pachymenes.
