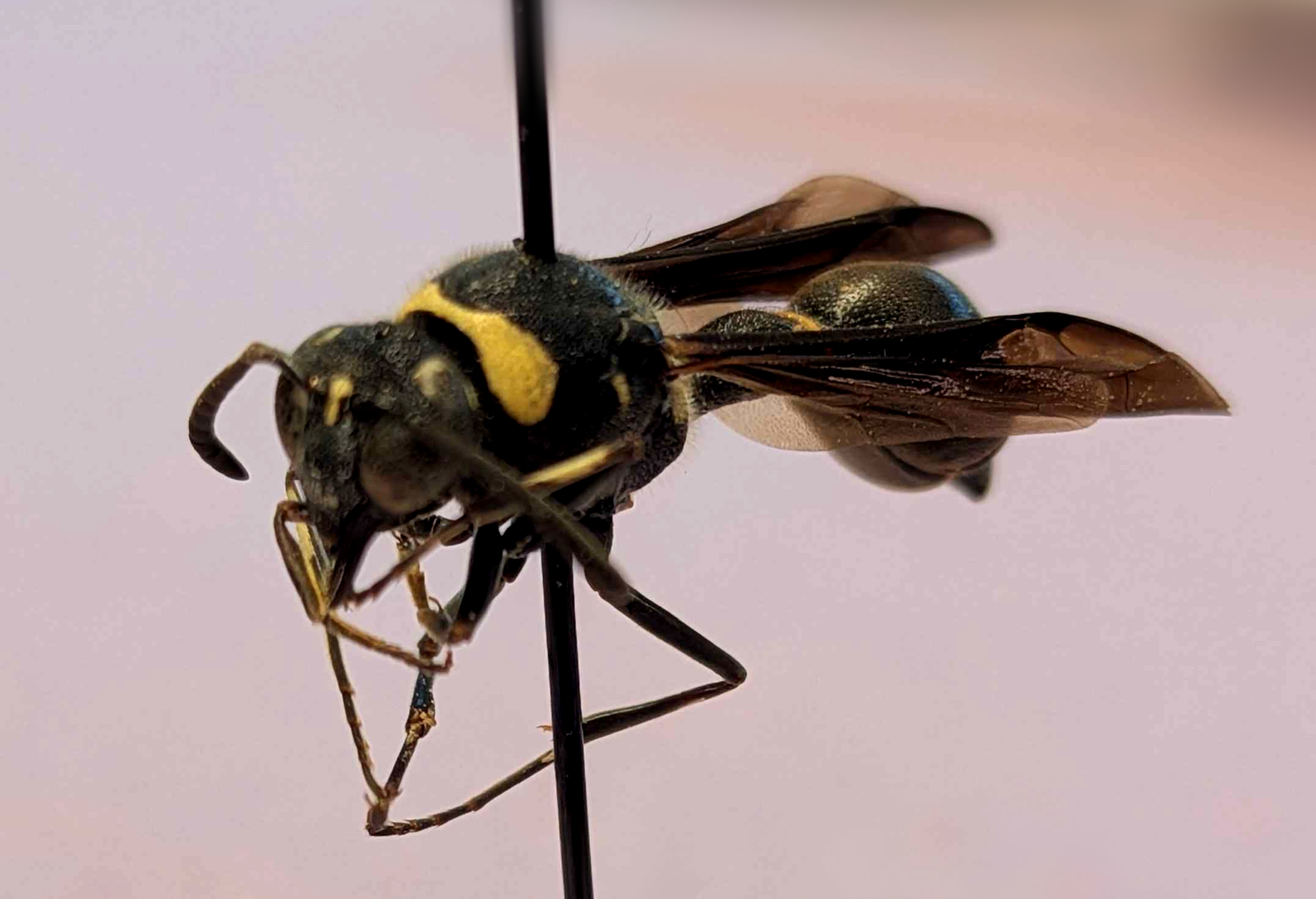

Scientific classification
- Kingdom: Animalia
- Phylum: Arthropoda
- Clade: Pancrustacea
- Class: Insecta
- Order: Hymenoptera
- Family: Vespidae
- Genus: Eumenes
- Species: E. smithii

Binomial name
- Eumenes smithii de Saussure, 1852

= Eumenes smithii =

Species of wasp

Eumenes smithii, or Smith's potter wasp, is a species of solitary mason wasp in the family Vespidae. E. smithii can be found in throughout the eastern U.S and Mexico.

== Subspecies ==
- Eumenes smithii americanus de Saussure, 1852
- Eumenes smithii smithii de Saussure, 1852
