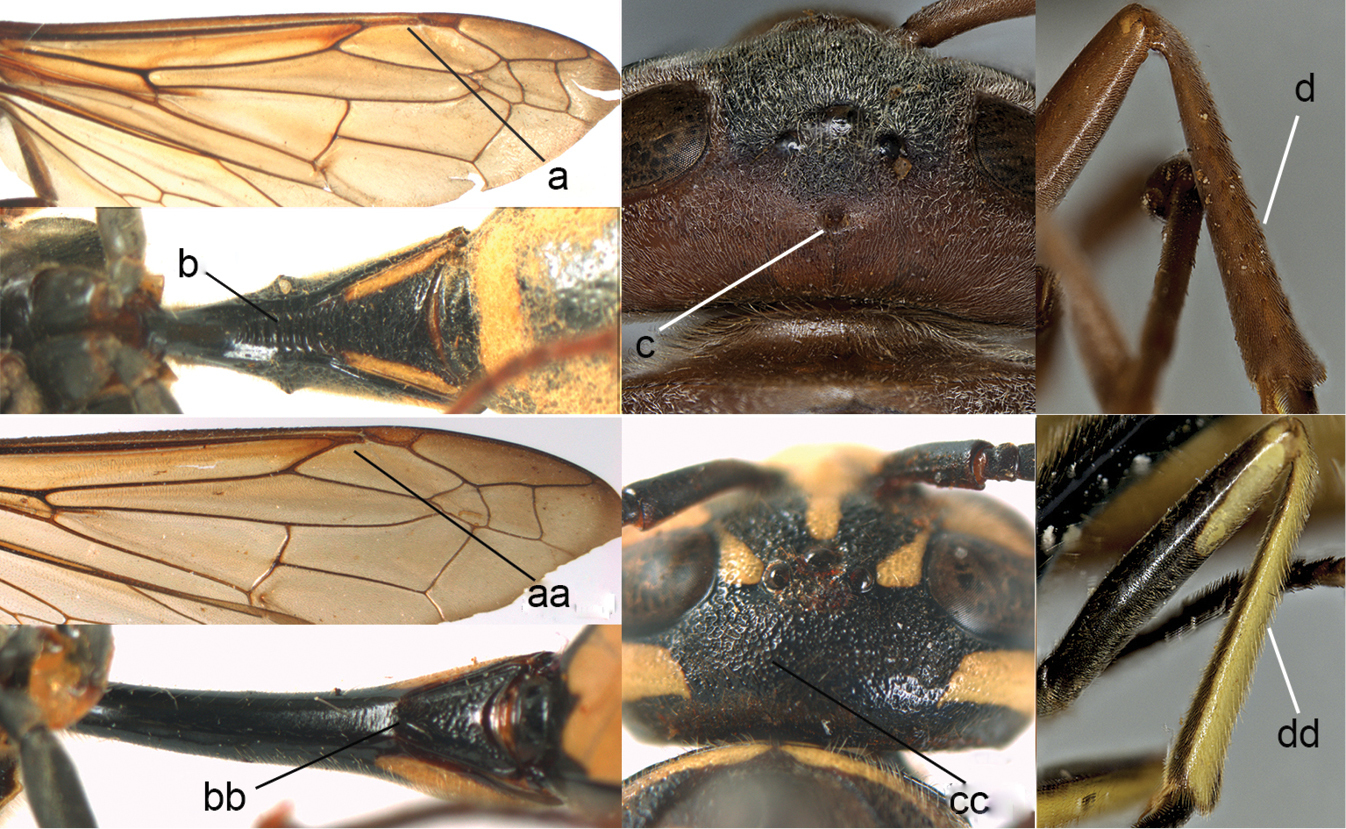

Scientific classification
- Kingdom: Animalia
- Phylum: Arthropoda
- Clade: Pancrustacea
- Class: Insecta
- Order: Hymenoptera
- Family: Vespidae
- Subfamily: Eumeninae
- Genus: Pseumenes; Giordani Soika, 1935

Type species
- Pseumenes eximius (Smith, 1861)

= Pseumenes =

Genus of wasps

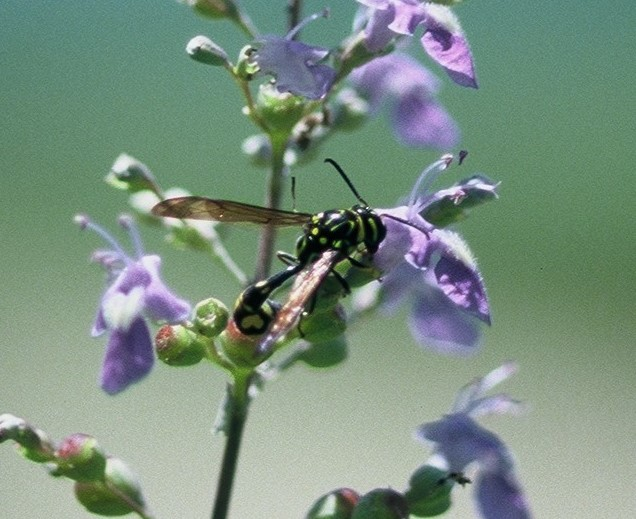
Pseumenes depressus robbing necter of a flower of Vitex trifolia. Iriomote Is., Japan

Pseumenes is an Indomalayan, Australian and Palearctic genus of potter wasps.

== Species ==
The following species are classified within the genus Pseumenes:

- Pseumenes azurescens Selis, 2017
- Pseumenes depressus (de Saussure, 1856)
- Pseumenes eximus (Smith, 1861)
- Pseumenes laboriosus (Smith, 1861)
- Pseumenes medianus (Smith, 1863)
- Pseumenes palawanensis Giordani Soika, 1993
- Pseumenes polillensis Giordani Soika, 1941
- Pseumenes siangensis Marco Selis,2024
