= Santamenes =

Scientific classification
- Kingdom: Animalia
- Phylum: Arthropoda
- Clade: Pancrustacea
- Class: Insecta
- Order: Hymenoptera
- Family: Vespidae
- Subfamily: Eumeninae
- Genus: Santamenes; Giordani Soika, 1990

Type species
- Santamenes santanna (Saussure, 1867)

Species
- Santamenes novarae (Saussure, 1867); Santamenes olympicus (Zavaratti, 1912); Santamenes peregrinus (Zavaratti, 1912); Santamenes santanna (Saussure, 1867)

Genus of wasps

Santamenes is a small but widely distributed neotropical genus of potter wasp. It has been proposed that Santamenes be merged into Pachymenes.
