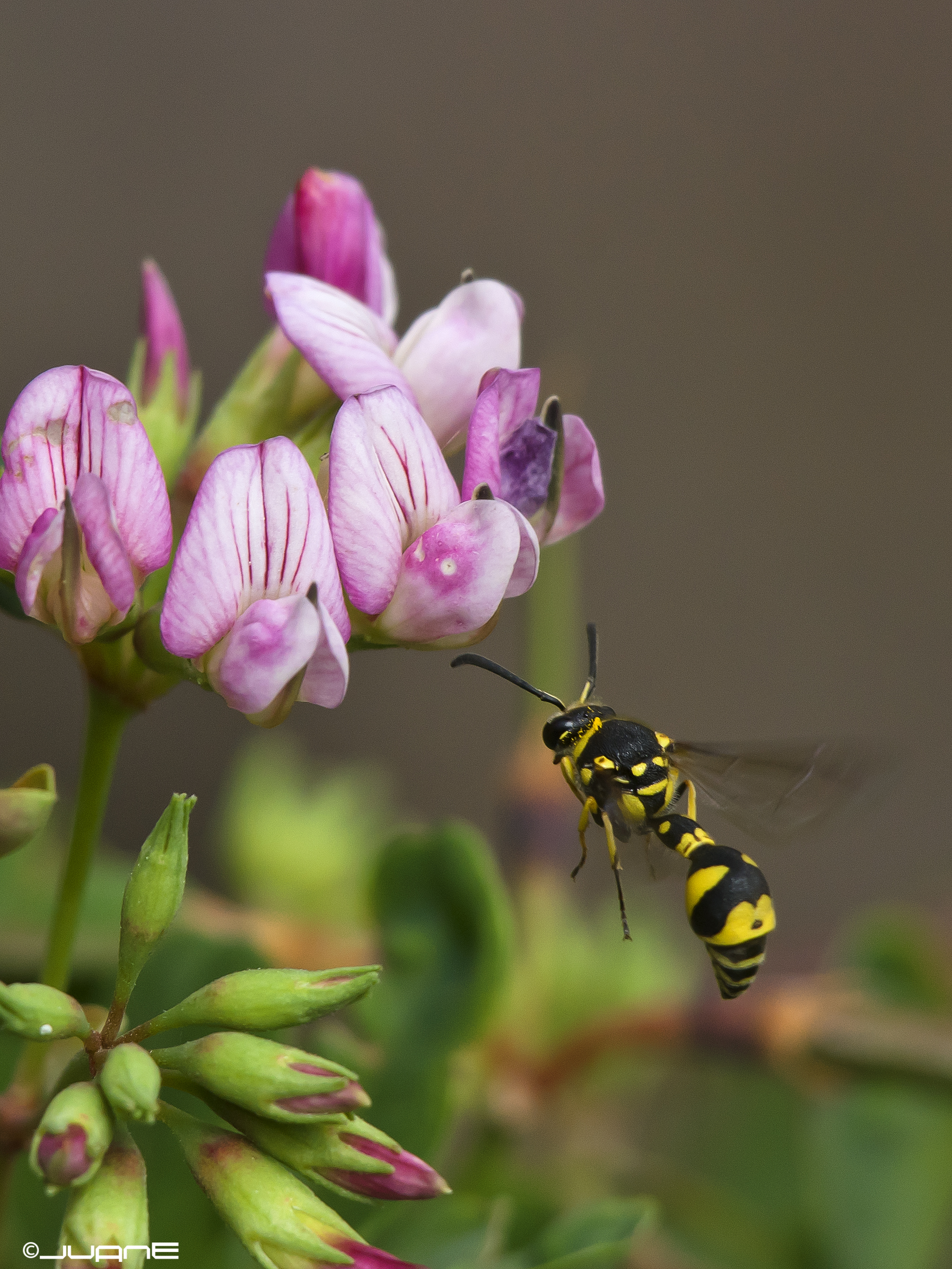
- Eumenes mediterraneus. Female

Scientific classification
- Kingdom: Animalia
- Phylum: Arthropoda
- Clade: Pancrustacea
- Class: Insecta
- Order: Hymenoptera
- Family: Vespidae
- Genus: Eumenes
- Species: E. mediterraneus

Binomial name
- Eumenes mediterraneus Kriechbaumer, 1879

= Eumenes mediterraneus =

Species of wasp

Eumenes mediterraneus is a species of potter wasp in the subfamily Eumeninae of the family Vespidae.

== Subspecies ==
- Eumenes mediterraneus cypricus Bluethgen, 1938
- Eumenes mediterraneus mediterraneus Kriechbaumer, 1879

== Distribution ==
This species is found in most European countries, in the Near East and in North Africa.

== Description ==
Eumenes mediterraneus can reach a length of about 15 millimeters. The body is black with yellow markings. Clypeus is mainly yellow and scutellum has two large spots. Tergite I has a broad apical yellow band. Tergite II has two large yellow bands laterally and a pale and translucent apical lamella. Tergites V and VI have a yellow apical band.

In males the antennae are curled at the tip. In females the segment between the compound eyes is yellow with black spots in the inferior part.
