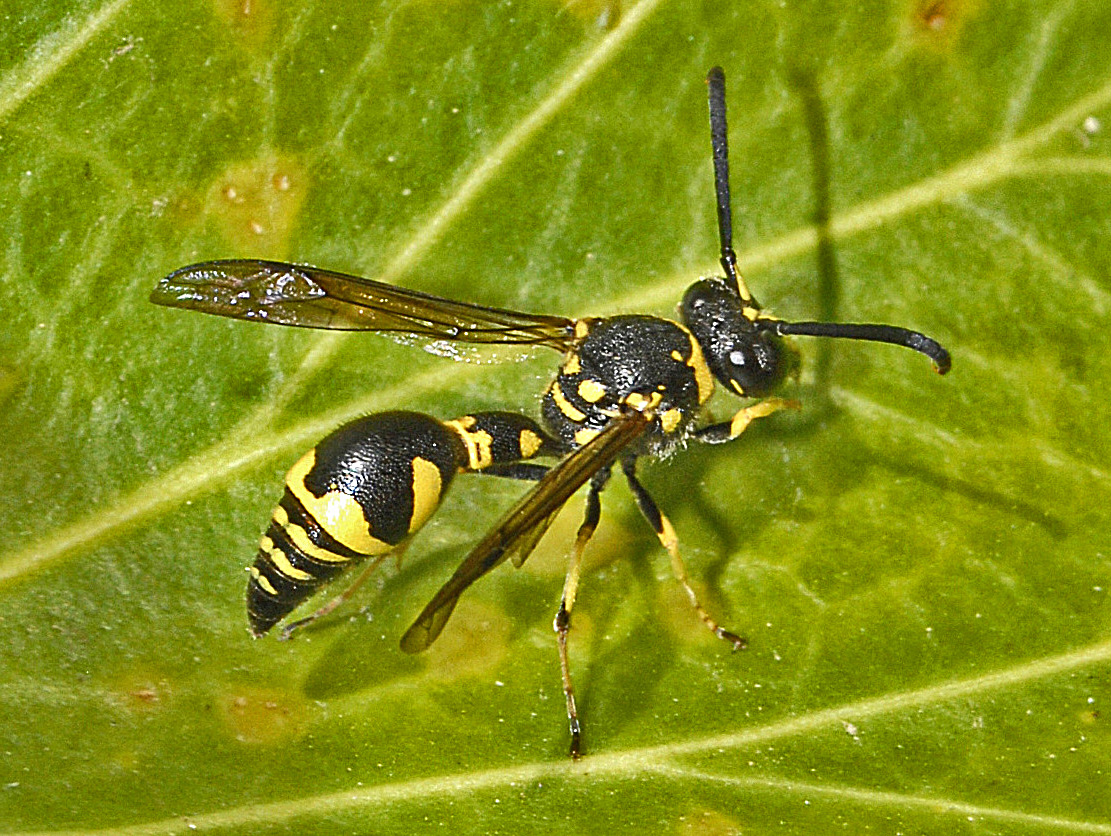
- Eumenes dubius. Male

Scientific classification
- Kingdom: Animalia
- Phylum: Arthropoda
- Clade: Pancrustacea
- Class: Insecta
- Order: Hymenoptera
- Family: Vespidae
- Genus: Eumenes
- Species: E. dubius

Binomial name
- Eumenes dubius Saussure, 1852

= Eumenes dubius =

Species of wasp

Eumenes dubius is a species of potter wasp in the subfamily Eumeninae of the family Vespidae.

== Subspecies ==
- Eumenes dubius dubius Saussure, 1852
- Eumenes dubius palaestinensis Blüthgen, 1938

== Distribution ==
This species can be found in southern Europe and in the Near East (Spain, France, Italy, Bulgaria, Greece, Cyprus, Israel, Lebanon, Syria, Russia, Persia, Malta and Turkey).

== Description ==
Eumenes dubius can reach a length of about 13 millimetres. The first metasomal segment is narrow and elongated, creating a "bulbous" appearance to the abdomen. Body is black with yellow markings. These wasps lack of standing hairs on the first tergum and show a very short general pilosity, with a short pubescence on head's rear. In males clypeus is long, with smooth and bright yellow free margin. Mandibles are orange yellow, basally spotted. In the females scape is ventrally yellow, while dorsally it is orange-yellow, with a thin black line on flagellomeres 3–9. These flagellomeres are black dorsally, while the others are orange-yellow. The last flagellomere is recurved.

== Biology ==
These potter wasp are predatory of caterpillars. They build cells which are complete spherical pots.

== Bibliography ==
- Antonio Giordani Soika (1952) Bull.Soc.Sci.nat.Maroc Hyménoptères réecoltés par une Mission suisse au Maroc (1947), Volume: 32 Pages: 235-267
- Horst-Günter Woydak (2001) Natur und Heimat Die solitären Faltenwespen: Eumenidae (Lehmwespen) und Masaridae (Honigwespen im Westfälischen Museum für Naturkunde Münster, Volume: 61 Pages: 85-95
