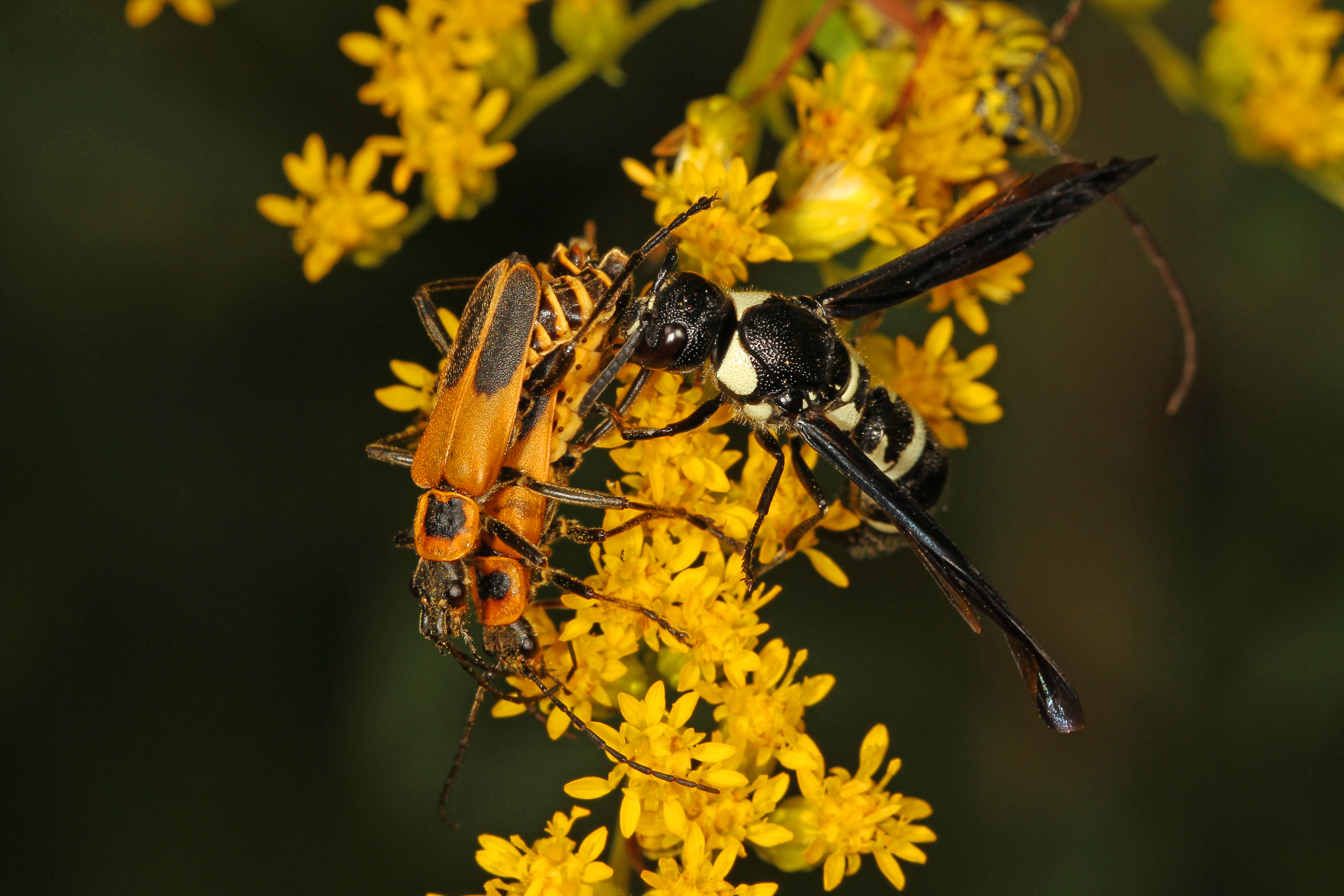
- Adult on flowers with Goldenrod Soldier Beetles Chauliognathus pennsylvanica

Scientific classification
- Kingdom: Animalia
- Phylum: Arthropoda
- Clade: Pancrustacea
- Class: Insecta
- Order: Hymenoptera
- Family: Vespidae
- Subfamily: Eumeninae
- Genus: Pseudodynerus; Saussure, 1855

Species
- 16 species

= Pseudodynerus =

Genus of wasps

Pseudodynerus is a small Neotropical genus of potter wasps (Hymenoptera: Vespidae: Eumeninae) currently containing 16 species.

The known species are:

- Pseudodynerus auratoides (Bertoni)
- Pseudodynerus carpenteri Hermes & Melo
- Pseudodynerus crypticus Hermes & Melo
- Pseudodynerus garcetei Hermes
- Pseudodynerus griseolus (Brèthes)
- Pseudodynerus griseus (Fox)
- Pseudodynerus hallinani Bequaert
- Pseudodynerus luctuosus (Saussure)
- Pseudodynerus maxillaris (Saussure)
- Pseudodynerus migonei (Bertoni)
- Pseudodynerus obesus Hermes & Melo
- Pseudodynerus penicillatus (Zavattari)
- Pseudodynerus quadrisectus (Say)
- Pseudodynerus serratus (Fox)
- Pseudodynerus singularis Hermes & Melo
- Pseudodynerus subapicalis (Fox)
