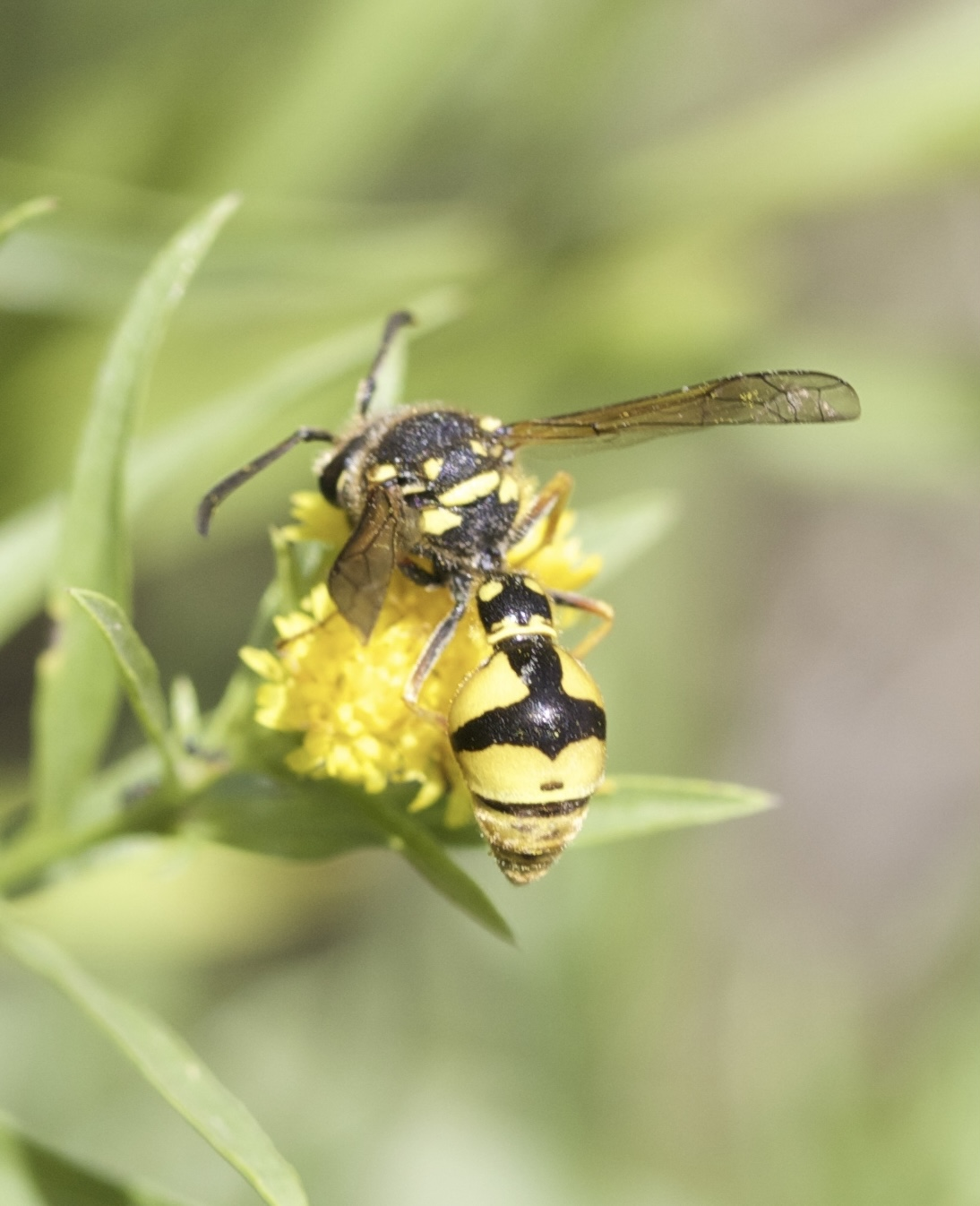
- Sonoma County, California, 2016

Scientific classification
- Domain: Eukaryota
- Kingdom: Animalia
- Phylum: Arthropoda
- Class: Insecta
- Order: Hymenoptera
- Family: Vespidae
- Genus: Eumenes
- Species: E. crucifera

Binomial name
- Eumenes crucifera Provancher, 1888

= Eumenes crucifera =

Species of potter wasp

Eumenes crucifera, also known as the cross potter wasp, is a North American species of potter wasp found in Canada, the United States, and Mexico. E. crucifera has a "range of variation mainly in coloration". In part due to this phenotypic variation, there were previously four recognized subspecies, one of which (Eumenes flavitinctus) has been elevated to full species status, and three of which have been eliminated and upmerged back into E. crucifera as of 2018.
