= Eumenes massarum =

Scientific classification
- Kingdom: Animalia
- Phylum: Arthropoda
- Clade: Pancrustacea
- Class: Insecta
- Order: Hymenoptera
- Family: Vespidae
- Genus: Eumenes
- Species: E. massarum

Binomial name
- Eumenes massarum Polašek, 2025

Species of potter wasp

Eumenes massarum is a species of potter wasp in the subfamily Eumeninae of the family Vespidae. It was described in 2025 from Croatia on the basis of morphological, morphometric and molecular (COI DNA barcoding) evidence. Its recognition brought the number of known European species of the genus Eumenes to fourteen.

== Taxonomy ==
Specimens of E. massarum had long gone unrecognised, as they were routinely misidentified as the allopatric Eumenes papillarius (Christ, 1791) owing to the close morphological similarity between the two taxa. Analyses of morphology, morphometrics and mitochondrial COI sequences showed that E. massarum is a distinct species, genetically more closely related to Eumenes pedunculatus (Panzer, 1799) than to E. papillarius.

The European fauna of the genus was reviewed in 2023 by van Achterberg, Smit and Ljubomirov, who recognised thirteen species; the description of E. massarum raised this number to fourteen.

== Description ==
Like other members of the genus, E. massarum has the characteristic potter-wasp habitus, with a narrow, elongate first metasomal segment (petiole) and wings folded longitudinally at rest. The species closely resembles E. papillarius, from which it can be separated by a combination of morphological and morphometric characters detailed in the original description.

== Distribution ==
Available records indicate a restricted distribution, primarily in the coastal and mountainous regions of Croatia. The species is considered allopatric with respect to E. papillarius.
