= Pseumenes siangensis =

Scientific classification
- Kingdom: Animalia
- Phylum: Arthropoda
- Class: Insecta
- Order: Hymenoptera
- Family: Vespidae
- Genus: Pseumenes
- Species: P. siangensis

Binomial name
- Pseumenes siangensis Femi, Ranjith & Priyadarsanan, 2024

Species of wasp

Pseumenes siangensis is a species of potter wasp from India. The new species of potter wasp, P. siangensis reported from Arunachal Pradesh in India's Eastern Himalaya which is named after the Siang Valley from where it was found and reported recently.
