= Acarepipona =

Scientific classification
- Domain: Eukaryota
- Kingdom: Animalia
- Phylum: Arthropoda
- Class: Insecta
- Order: Hymenoptera
- Family: Vespidae
- Subfamily: Eumeninae
- Genus: Acarepipona; Giordani Soika, 1985

Species
- Acarepipona curvirufolineata; Acarepipona insolita; Acarepipona pervigilans

Genus of wasps

Acarepipona is an Afrotropical genus of potter wasps.
