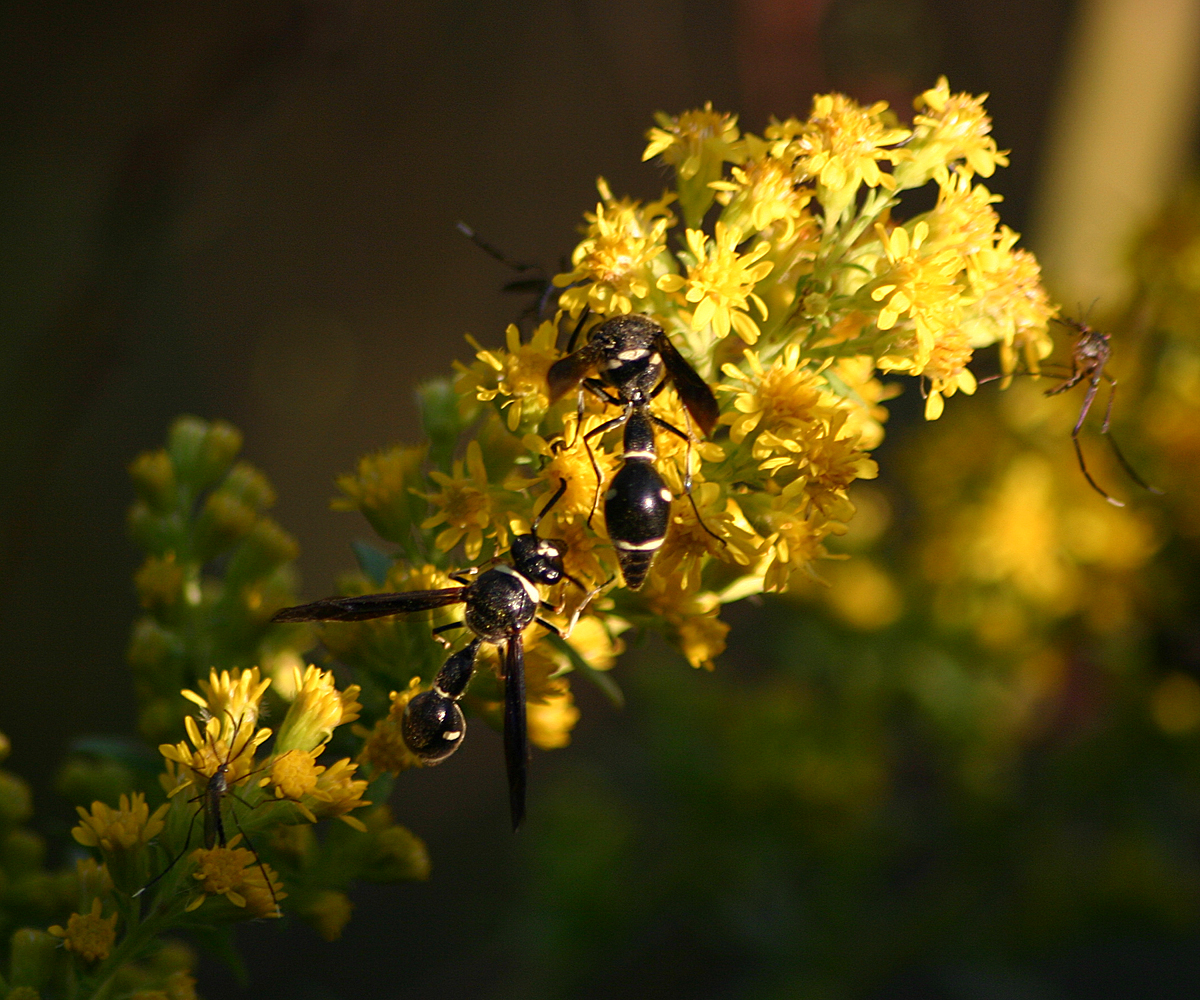
- Eumenes fraternus and mosquitoes collecting nectar on Solidago

Scientific classification
- Kingdom: Animalia
- Phylum: Arthropoda
- Clade: Pancrustacea
- Class: Insecta
- Order: Hymenoptera
- Family: Vespidae
- Subfamily: Eumeninae
- Genus: Eumenes
- Species: E. fraternus

Binomial name
- Eumenes fraternus Say, 1824

= Eumenes fraternus =

Species of wasp

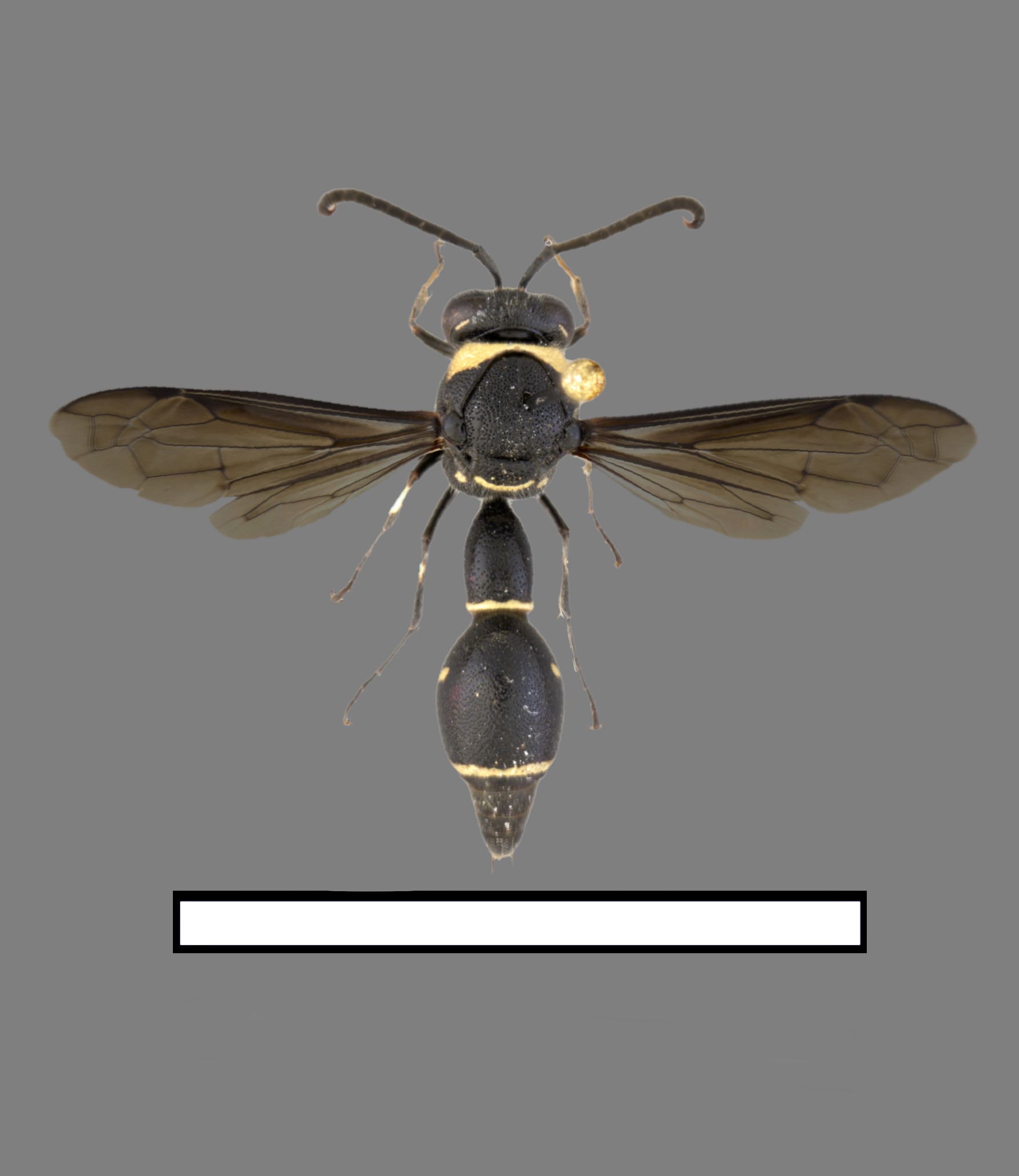
Dorsal view of a Eumenes fraternus Say, 1824 specimen collected from Baldwin County, Georgia on September 4, 2024. Scale bar indicates 10 mm.

Eumenes fraternus is a species of potter wasp in the subfamily Eumeninae of the family Vespidae. It is native to the eastern United States and Canada. The female builds a miniature pot out of mud in which it lays an egg and places a live caterpillar. Its developing larva feeds on this whereas the adult wasp feeds primarily on nectar.

== Description ==
Wasps in the genus Eumenes can be recognised by the fact that the first abdominal segment is long and slender, very thin at the front and widening towards the back. Eumenes fraternus is about 15 to 20 mm (0.6 to 0.8 in) long and is similar in appearance to other members of the genus. Its colouring is black with a scattering of ivory-coloured markings. The forewings are 8 to 10.5 mm (0.3 to 0.4 in) long in the male and 10 to 12.5 mm (0.4 to 0.5 in) in the female. It has shorter pubescence on the first segment of the antenna than do the otherwise similar E. crucifera and E. verticalis.

== Distribution and habitat ==
Eumenes fraternus is found in the eastern United States and Canada. Its range extends west as far as Ontario, Minnesota, Kansas and Texas. It is on the wing from about April to November in North Carolina and is found in glades, rough shrubby areas and forest verges.

== Biology ==
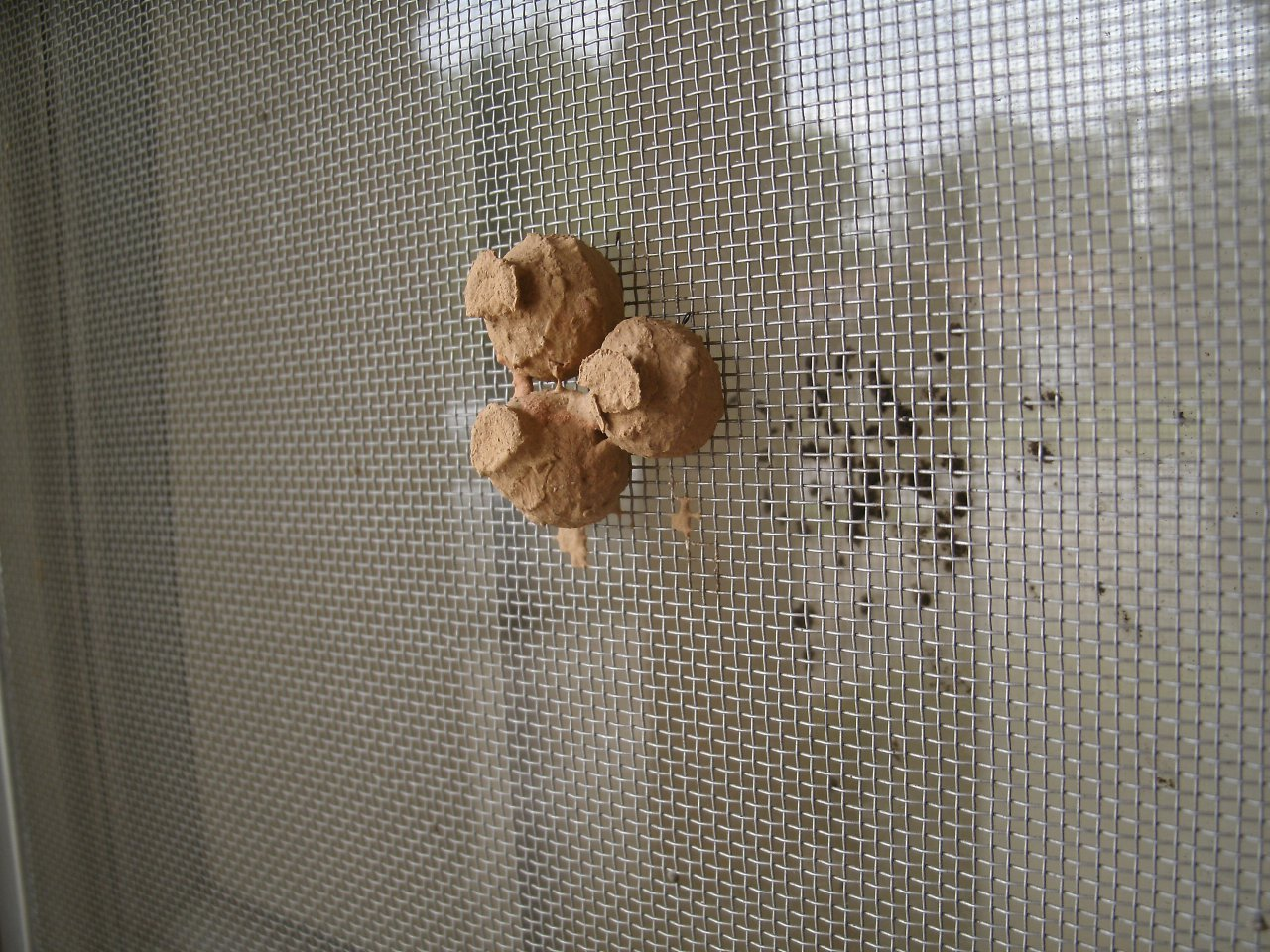
Potter wasp's nests in Arkansas

Like other members of the genus, the female Eumenes fraternus builds a pitcher-shaped nest in which to lay an egg. This is made with mud, the wasp collecting a drop of water and then a dry particle of soil, dampening the soil and putting it in place. Several hundred such fragments will be needed and the pot may take one or two hours to build. When it is ready, the wasp inserts her abdomen into the hollow interior and lays an egg, suspending it on a fine thread. She then searches for suitable food to put inside the pot on which her developing larva may feed. Usually this is the larva of a butterfly or moth that has been stung to paralyse it and which will remain alive and fresh until the developing wasp larva needs it. When she has placed enough provisions in the pot, the wasp seals the top with damp soil and goes off to build another nest. The adult insects feed mainly on nectar that they gather from flowers, but they also feed on pollen with its higher protein content.
