= Acarepipona pervigilans =

Scientific classification
- Kingdom: Animalia
- Phylum: Arthropoda
- Clade: Pancrustacea
- Class: Insecta
- Order: Hymenoptera
- Family: Vespidae
- Genus: Acarepipona
- Species: A. pervigilans

Binomial name
- Acarepipona pervigilans (Giordani Soika, 1944)

Species of wasp

Acarepipona pervigilans is a species of wasp in the family Vespidae.
