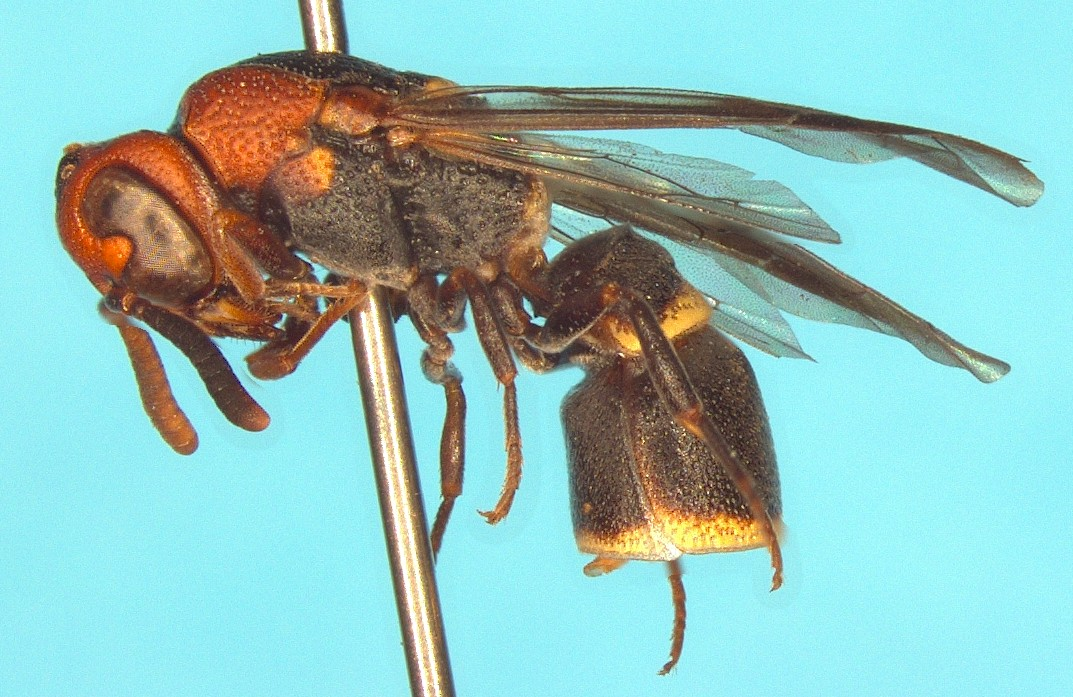
- Cephalastor rominae Garcete-Barrett

Scientific classification
- Domain: Eukaryota
- Kingdom: Animalia
- Phylum: Arthropoda
- Class: Insecta
- Order: Hymenoptera
- Family: Vespidae
- Subfamily: Eumeninae
- Genus: Cephalastor

Species
- 12 species

= Cephalastor =

Genus of wasps

Cephalastor is a small neotropical genus of potter wasps (Hymenoptera: Vespidae: Eumeninae) currently containing 14 species.

The known species are:

- Cephalastor sinusiticus Garcete-Barrett, 2002 (Mexico)
- Cephalastor lambayeque Garcete-Barrett, 2002 (Coastal Peru)
- Cephalastor bossanova Garcete-Barrett, 2002 (Southern Brazil)
- Cephalastor estela Garcete-Barrett, 2002 (Paraguay and Brazil)
- Cephalastor humeralis Garcete-Barrett & Hermes, 2009 (Brazil)
- Cephalastor mariachi Garcete-Barrett, 2001 (Mexico)
- Cephalastor minarum Garcete-Barrett & Hermes, 2009 (Brazil)
- Cephalastor abraham Garcete-Barrett, 2001 (Ecuador)
- Cephalastor tupasy Garcete-Barrett, 2001 (Peruvian Amazon)
- Cephalastor relativus (Fox, 1902) (Suriname, Eastern Colombia, Ecuador, Bolivia and Central Brazil)
- Cephalastor rufosuffusus (Fox, 1902) (Guyana, Central Brazil and Paraguay)
- Cephalastor paezi Garcete-Barrett, 2001 (Colombian Llanos)
- Cephalastor rominae Garcete-Barrett, 2001 (Paraguayan Chaco)
- Cephalastor chasqui Garcete-Barrett, 2001 (Eastern Bolivia and Andean Peru)
