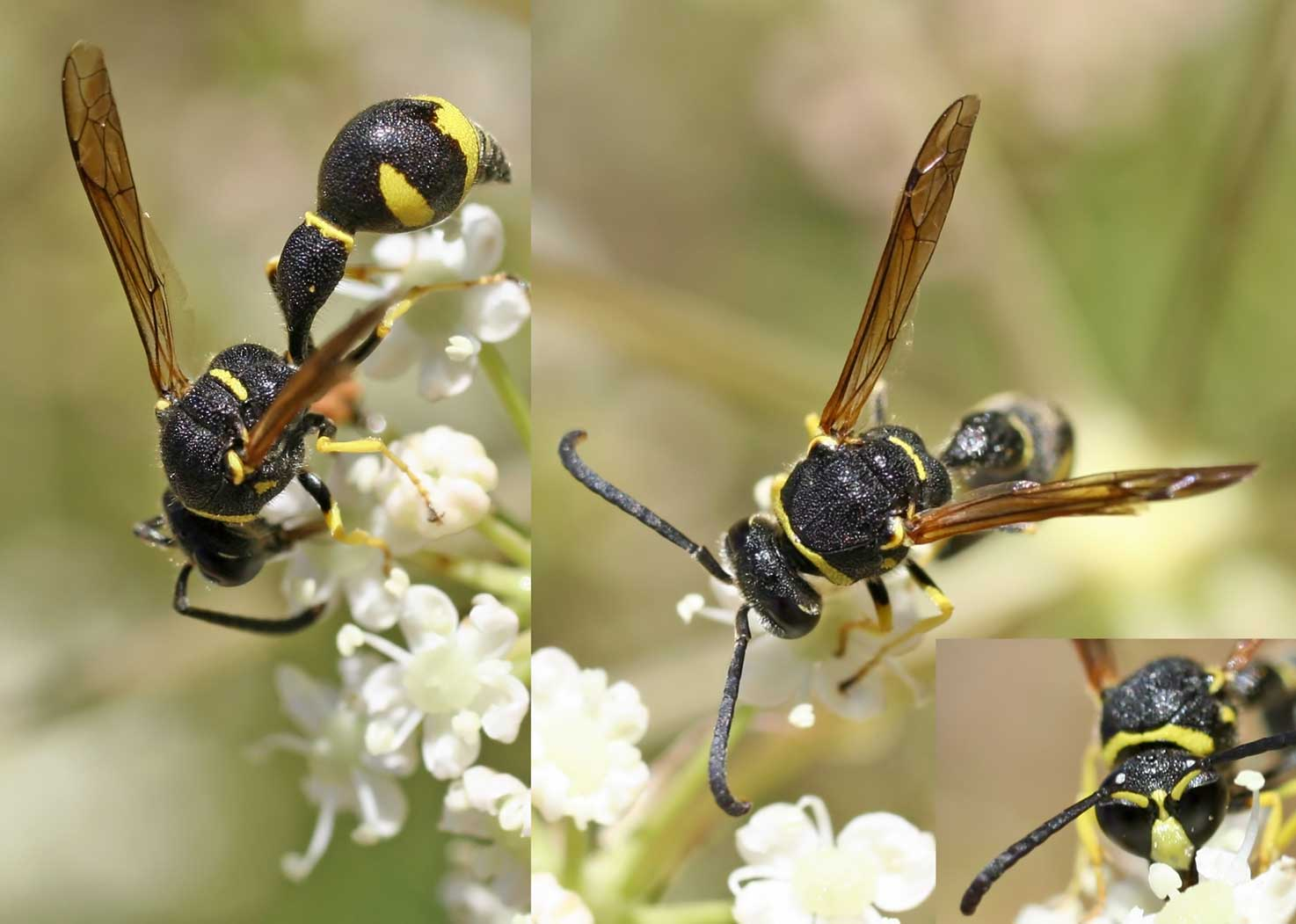
- Eumenes pomiformis
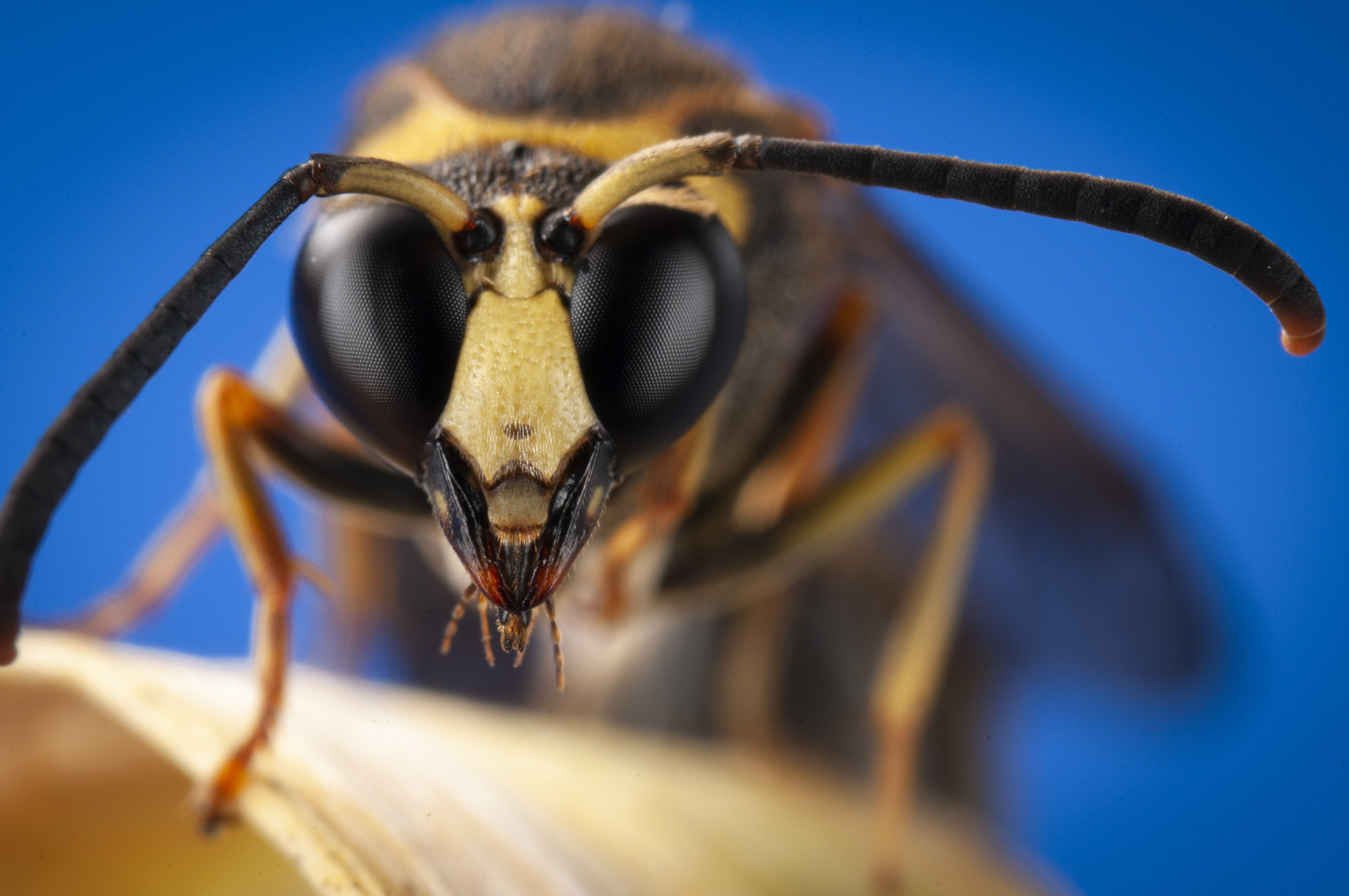
- Eumenes architectus, Adult, South Korea

Scientific classification
- Kingdom: Animalia
- Phylum: Arthropoda
- Clade: Pancrustacea
- Class: Insecta
- Order: Hymenoptera
- Family: Vespidae
- Subfamily: Eumeninae
- Genus: Eumenes; Latreille, 1802

Type species
- Eumenes coarctatus (Linnaeus, 1758)

Species
- >100, see text

Synonyms
- Alpha de Saussure, 1855; Eumenis Kriechbaumer, 1879; Eumemes Fox, 1899; Eumes Bertoni, 1910; Eumenidion von Schulthess, 1913; Eumenidium Sharp, 1914

= Eumenes (wasp) =

Genus of wasps

Eumenes is a genus of wasps in the subfamily Eumeninae. It is a large and widespread genus, with over 100 species and subspecies occurring worldwide. The genus was first proposed by Pierre André Latreille in 1802, with the type species later designated by Latreille in 1810. All species make jug-like nests out of mud, usually attached to twigs. The larvae are fed with caterpillars.

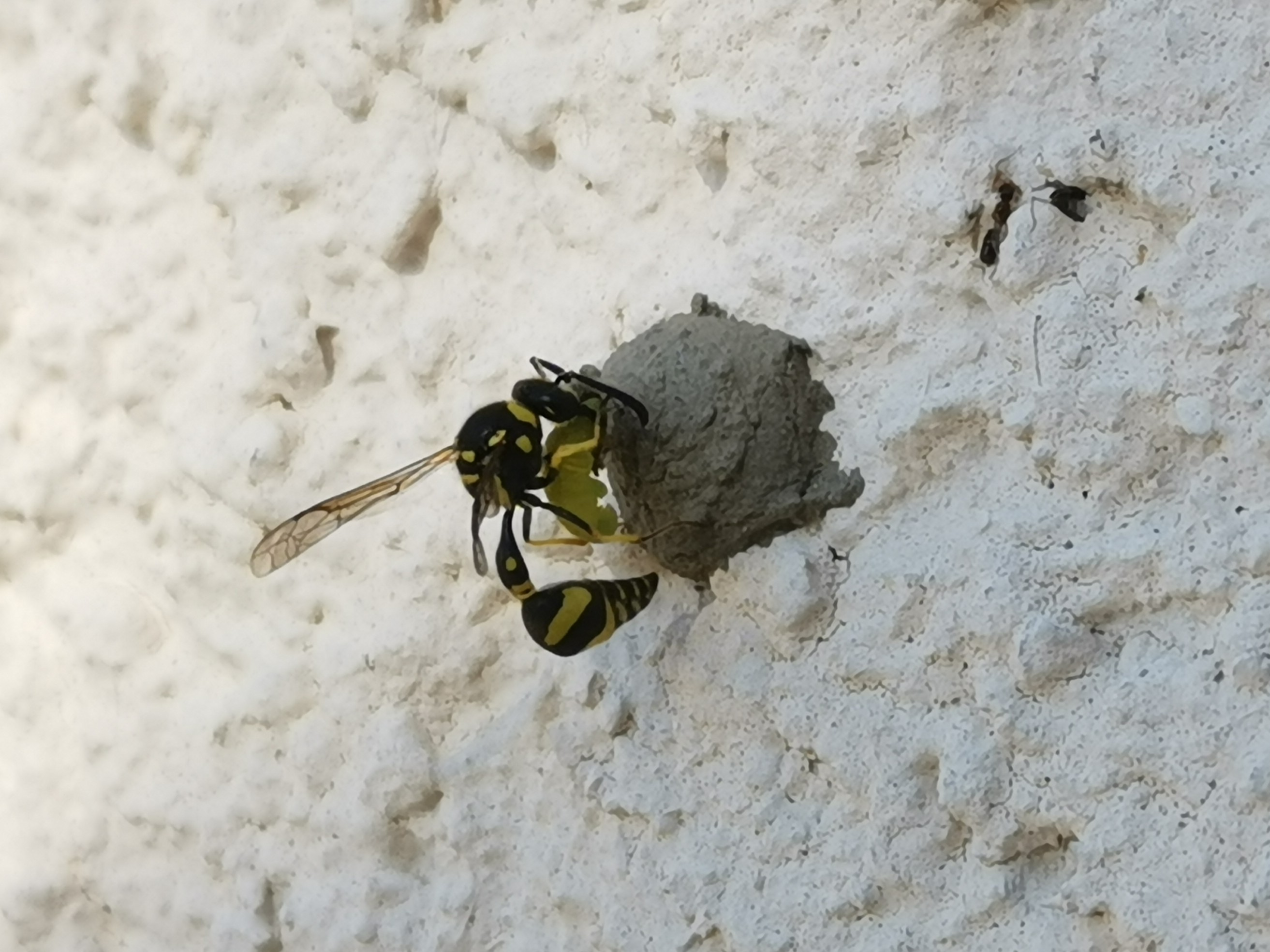
A Eumenes sp. is feeding a caterpillar into her nest.

== Species ==
- Eumenes achterbergi Giordani Soika, 1992
- Eumenes acuminatus de Saussure, 1856^{b}
- Eumenes aemilianus Guiglia, 1951
- Eumenes affinissimus de Saussure, 1852
- Eumenes agillimus Dalla Torre, 1894
- Eumenes americanus Saussure, 1852^{a}
- Eumenes antennatus Bingham, 1898
- Eumenes aquilonius Sk. Yamane, 1977
- Eumenes architectus Smith, 1858
- Eumenes arnoldi Bequaert, 1926^{b}
- Eumenes asiaticus Gusenleitner, 1970
- Eumenes assamensis Meade-Waldo, 1910
- Eumenes atrophicus (Fabricius, 1798)
- Eumenes batantanensis Nugroho, 2010
- Eumenes belli Giordani Soika, 1973
- Eumenes bequaerti Grandinete & Carpenter, 2018
- Eumenes blandus Smith, 1861 +
- Eumenes boettcheri Giordani Soika, 1941
- Eumenes bollii Cresson, 1872 +^{a}
- Eumenes buddha Cameron, 1898
- Eumenes capensis Schulthess, 1910^{b}
- Eumenes coarctatus (Linnaeus, 1758) +
- Eumenes comberi Dover, 1925
- Eumenes congnatus Nguyen, 2016
- Eumenes consobrinus de Saussure, 1856^{a}
- Eumenes coronatus (Panzer, 1799) +
- Eumenes coyotae Bohart, 1948
- Eumenes crucifera Provancher, 1888 +
- Eumenes cubensis Cresson, 1865^{a}
- Eumenes cyrenaicus Blüthgen, 1938 +
- Eumenes dichrous Maindron, 1882
- Eumenes diligens Smith, 1864
- Eumenes dorycus Maindron, 1882
- Eumenes dubius de Saussure, 1852 +
- Eumenes ferrugiantennus Zhou, Chen & Li, 2012
- Eumenes ferruapiculus Chen & Li, 2023
- Eumenes filiformis de Saussure, 1856
- Eumenes flavitinctus Bohart, 1950
- Eumenes floralis Smith, 1858
- Eumenes formosensis Giordani Soika, 1973
- Eumenes fraterculus Dalla Torre, 1894
- Eumenes fraternus Say, 1824
- Eumenes fuellebornianus Schulthess, 1910 +^{b}
- Eumenes fulvopilosellus Giordani Soika, 1965
- Eumenes gibbosus Nguyen, 2015
- Eumenes glacialis Giordani Soika, 1940
- Eumenes gribodianus Guiglia, 1933 +^{b}
- Eumenes guillarmodi Giordani Soika, 1975
- Eumenes humbertianus de Saussure, 1867
- Eumenes improvisus Giordani Soika, 1975^{b}
- Eumenes inconspicuus Smith, 1858 +
- Eumenes insolens Smith, 1865
- Eumenes interpositus Gusenleitner, 1972
- Eumenes jarkandensis Blüthgen, 1938
- Eumenes kangrae Dover, 1925
- Eumenes kiangsuensis Giordani Soika, 1941
- Eumenes koriensis Giordani Soika, 1992
- Eumenes labiatus Giordani Soika, 1941 +
- Eumenes longus Nguyen, 2016
- Eumenes lucasius de Saussure, 1852 +^{b}
- Eumenes macrops de Saussure, 1852
- Eumenes mainpuriensis Smith, 1870
- Eumenes makilingi Williams, 1928
- Eumenes massarum Polašek, 2025
- Eumenes mediterraneus Kriechbaumer, 1879 +^{b}
- Eumenes micado Cameron 1904
- Eumenes micropunctatus Giordani Soika, 1975 +^{b}
- Eumenes modestus Gusenleitner, 2006
- Eumenes mongolicus Morawitz, 1889
- Eumenes multipictus de Saussure, 1855
- Eumenes nigriscutatus Zhou, Chen & Li, 2012
- Eumenes papillarius (Christ, 1791) +
- Eumenes parisii Giordani Soika, 1939
- Eumenes pedunculatus (Panzer, 1799) +
- Eumenes peringeyanus Schulthess, 1913^{b}
- Eumenes persimilis Giordani Soika, 1960
- Eumenes pictus Smith, 1857^{a}
- Eumenes piriformis de Saussure, 1862 +
- Eumenes pius Giordani Soika, 1986 +
- Eumenes placens Nurse, 1903
- Eumenes pomiformis (Fabricius, 1781)
- Eumenes pseudubius Gusenleitner, 1972
- Eumenes punctaticlypeus Giordani Soika 1943 +
- Eumenes punctatus de Saussure, 1852 +
- Eumenes quadratus Smith, 1852 +
- Eumenes relatus Dover, 1925
- Eumenes rubrofemoratus Giordani Soika, 1941
- Eumenes rubronotatus Perez, 1905 +
- Eumenes rufomaculatus (Fox, 1899)
- Eumenes sardous Guiglia, 1951
- Eumenes sareptanus André, 1884 +
- Eumenes sculleni Bohart, 1950
- Eumenes selisi Fateryga, 2024
- Eumenes separatus Gusenleitner, 1972
- Eumenes septentrionalis Giordani Soika, 1940 +
- Eumenes signicornis Walker, 1871^{b}
- Eumenes sikkimensis Giordani Soika, 1986
- Eumenes simplicilamellatus Giordani Soika, 1934
- Eumenes smithii de Saussure, 1852 +
- Eumenes solidus Gusenleitner, 1972
- Eumenes subpomiformis Blüthgen, 1938 +
- Eumenes tosawae Giordani Soika, 1941 +
- Eumenes transbaicalicus Kurzenko, 1984
- Eumenes tricolor Smith, 1860
- Eumenes tripunctatus (Christ, 1791)
- Eumenes truncatus Nugroho, 2010
- Eumenes variepunctatus Giordani Soika, 1958
- Eumenes versicolor de Saussure, 1852^{a}
- Eumenes verticalis Say, 1824 +

Data sources: a = Giordani Soika (1978), b = Carpenter et al. (2010)

Notes: + = denotes species with described subspecies

== Gallery ==
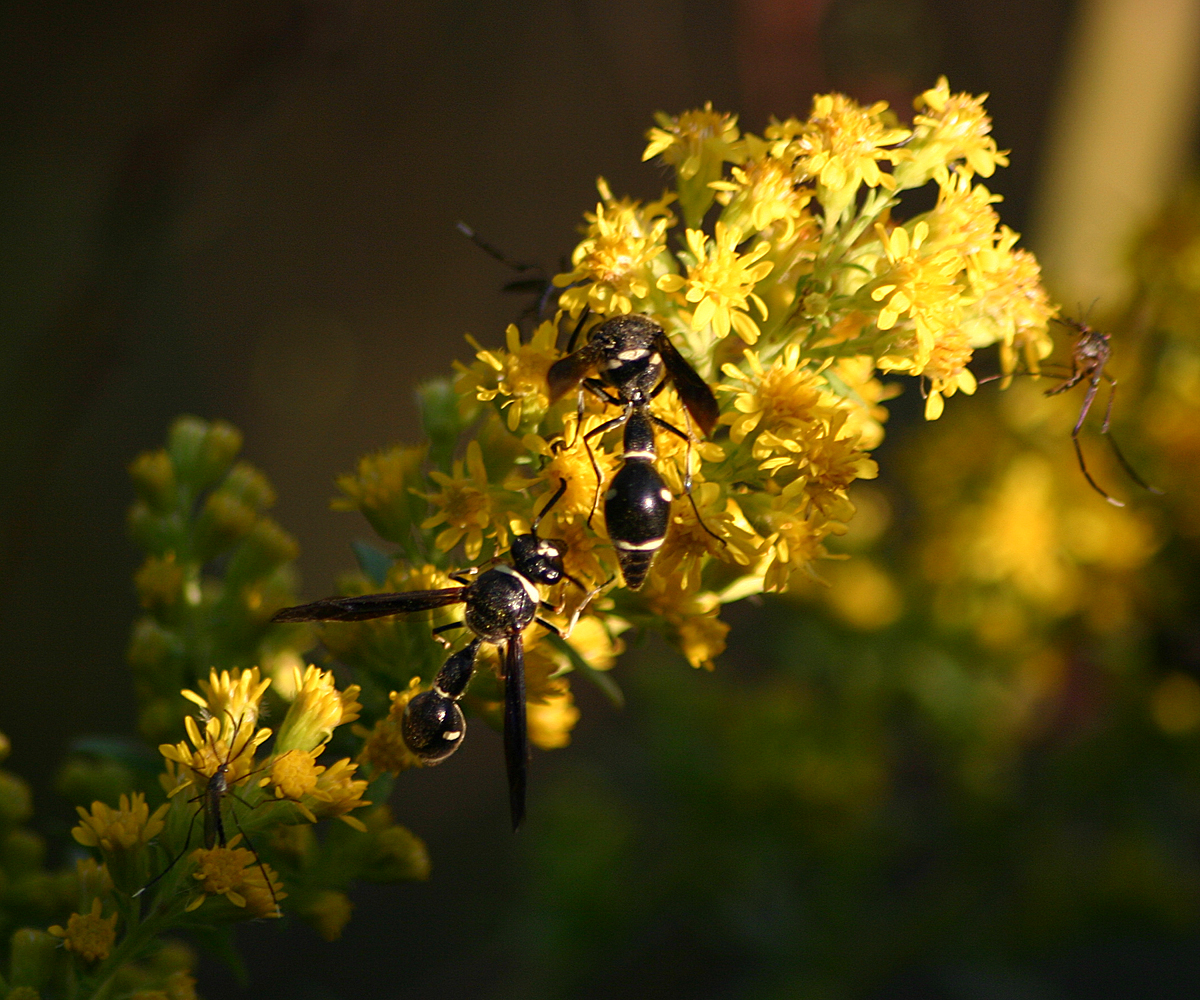
Eumenes fraternus and mosquitoes collecting nectar on Solidago

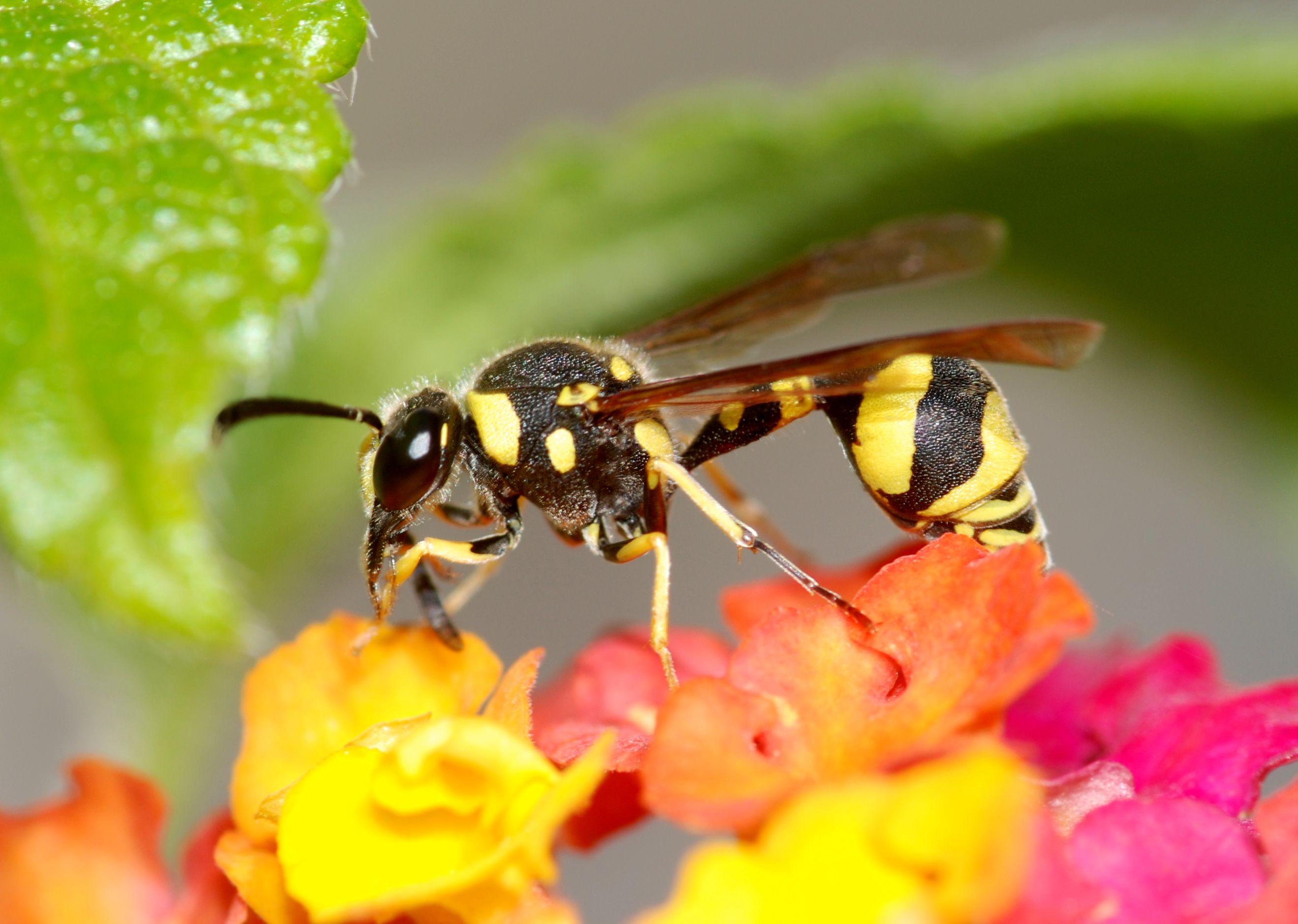
Eumenes cf. coarctatus.

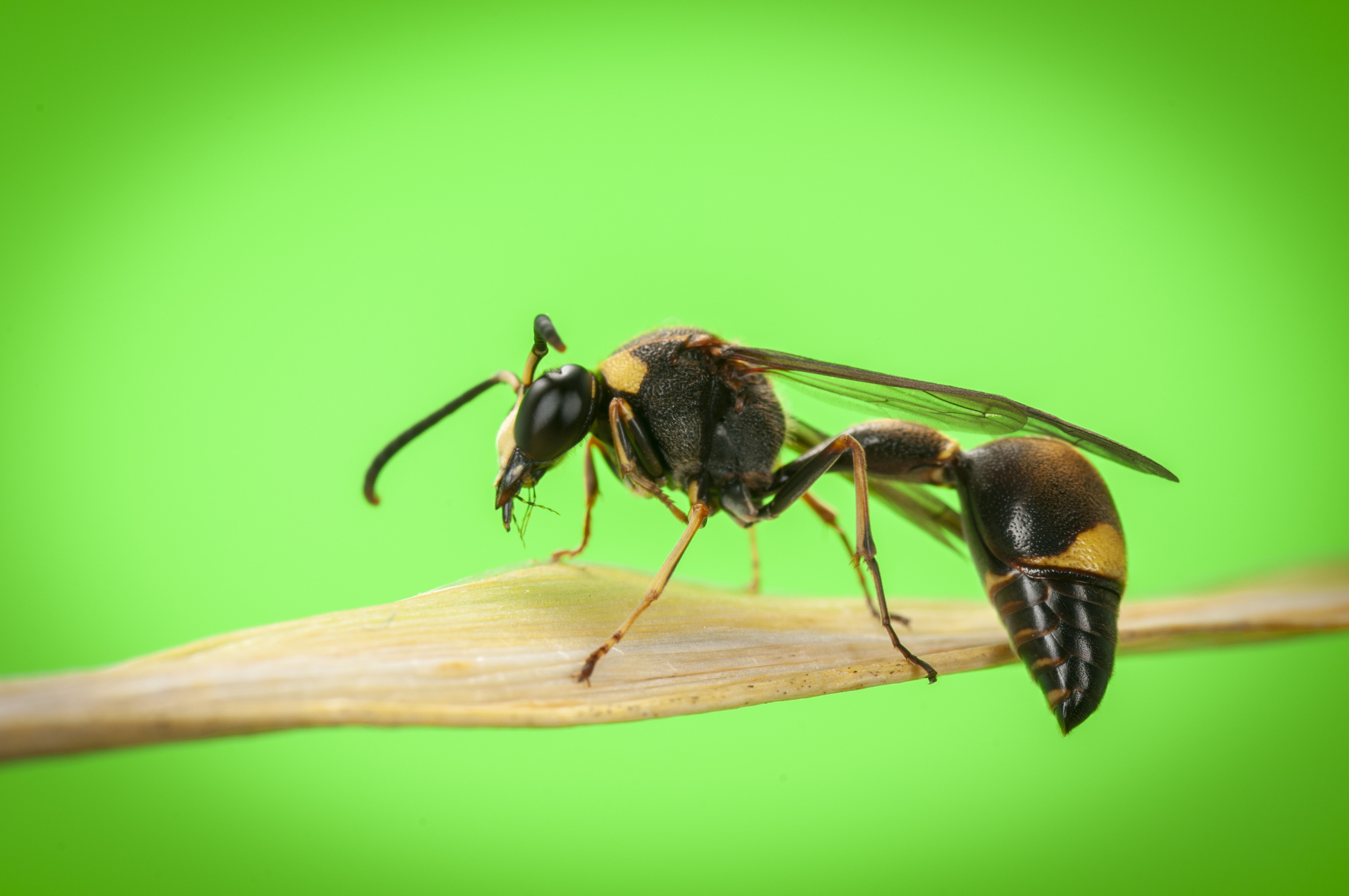
Eumenes architectus, Adult, South Korea
