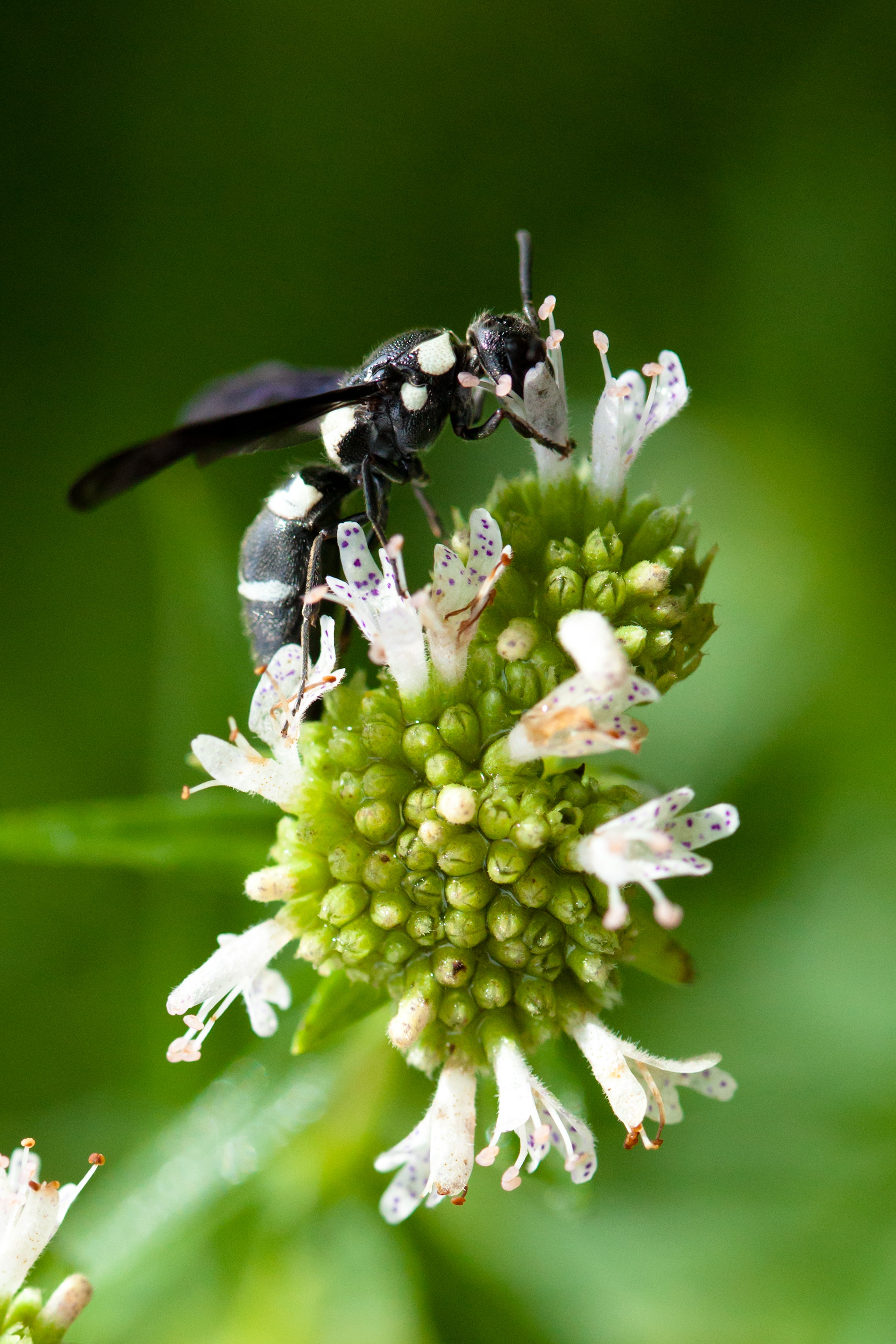

Scientific classification
- Kingdom: Animalia
- Phylum: Arthropoda
- Class: Insecta
- Order: Hymenoptera
- Family: Vespidae
- Genus: Pseudodynerus
- Species: P. quadrisectus

Binomial name
- Pseudodynerus quadrisectus Say, 1837

Synonyms
- Odynerus quadrisectus Say, 1837; Odynerus bellone Lepeletier, 1841; Odynerus aztecus Saussure, 1857; Ancistrocerus (Pseudodynerus) quadrisectus (Say, 1837); Ancistrocerus aztecus (Saussure, 1857)

= Pseudodynerus quadrisectus =

Species of wasp

Pseudodynerus quadrisectus is a species of solitary mason wasp in the genus Pseudodynerus and family Vespidae, first described by Thomas Say in 1837. It includes the subspecies P. q aztecus (Saussure, 1857).

== Description ==
A mid-to-large size wasp, its forewing length is 12–16 mm in females and 10.5–13 mm for males. Their coloring is mostly black, but with ivory markings that are more visible in females.

Mason wasps create nests with mud, constructing one or more separate chambers for their larvae, each stocked with an insect food source. Mason wasps are also known as potter wasps for the pot-like nests some other species build, but Pseudodynerus quadrisectus builds in existing cavities in wood, sometimes those previously used by other Hymenoptera like the carpenter bee.

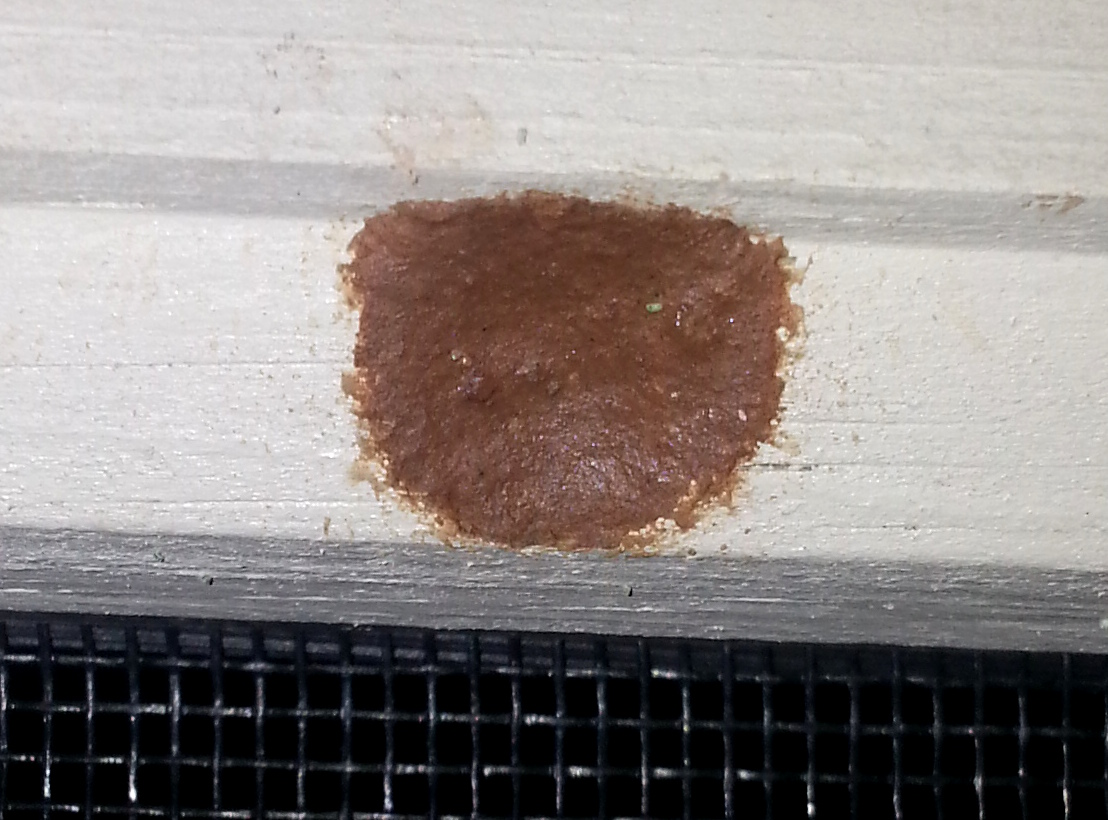
Pseudodynerus quadrisectus nest built in a hole bored by a carpenter bee

== Distribution ==
The species has been found in the United States from New Jersey down to Florida and west to Texas, as well as in Mexico and Costa Rica.
