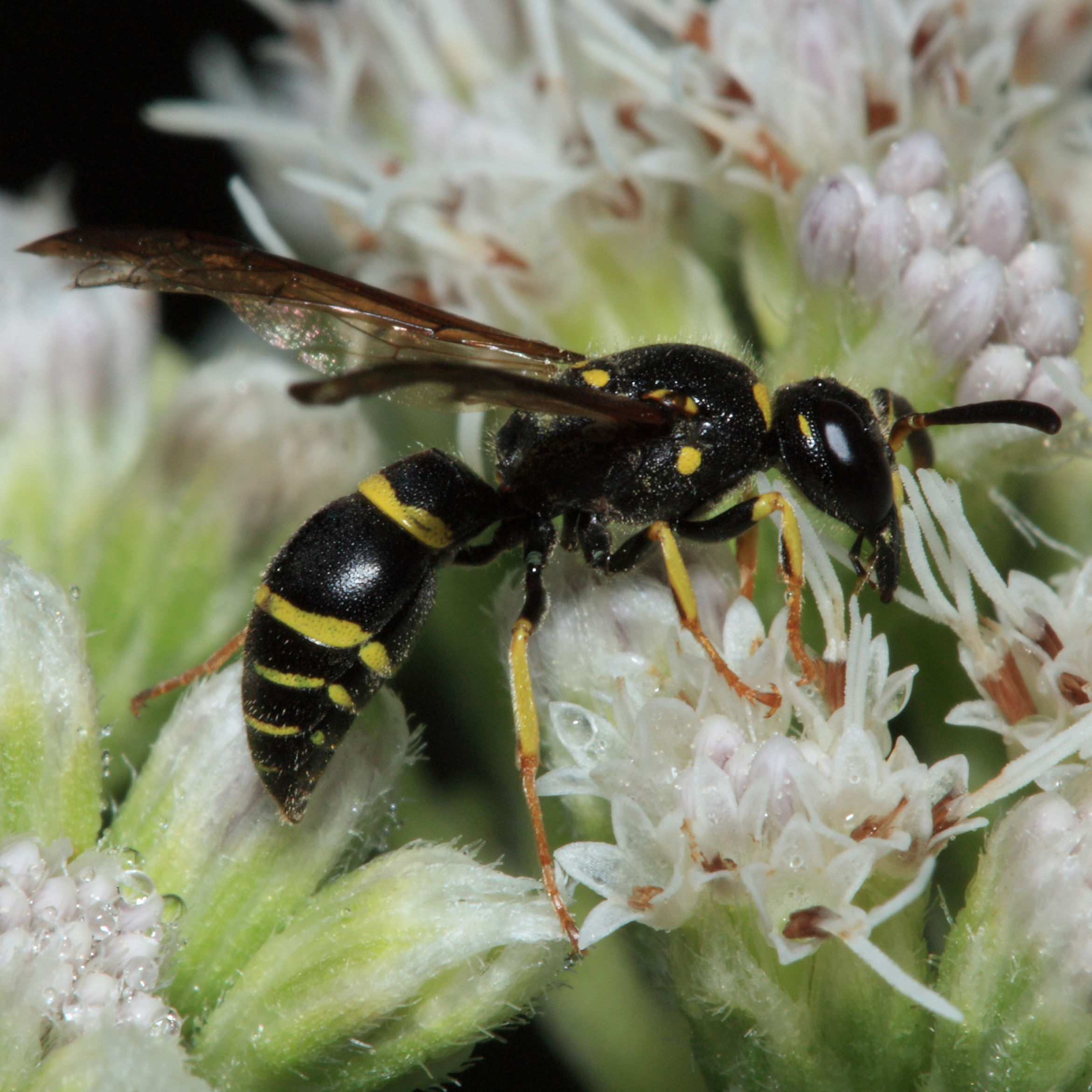
- Ancistrocerus species

Scientific classification
- Kingdom: Animalia
- Phylum: Arthropoda
- Clade: Pancrustacea
- Class: Insecta
- Order: Hymenoptera
- Family: Vespidae
- Subfamily: Eumeninae

Diversity
- Almost 200 genera and 3000 species

= Potter wasp =

Subfamily of insects

Potter wasps (or mason wasps), the Eumeninae, are a cosmopolitan wasp group considered as a subfamily of Vespidae, but were recognized in the past as a separate family, Eumenidae.

== Recognition ==
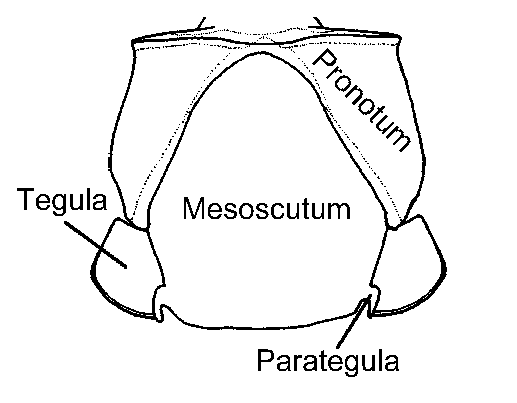
Partial dorsal view of the thorax of Cephalastor estela showing the position of tegulae and parategulae relative to the mesoscutum and pronotum

Most eumenine species are black or brown, and commonly marked with strikingly contrasting patterns of yellow, white, orange, or red (or combinations thereof), but some species, mostly from tropical regions, show faint to strong blue or green metallic highlights in the background colors. Like most vespids, their wings are folded longitudinally at rest. They are particularly recognized by the following combination of characteristics:

1. a posterolateral projection known as a parategula on both sides of the mesoscutum;
2. tarsal claws cleft;
3. hind coxae with a longitudinal dorsal carina or folding, often developed into a lobe or tooth, and;
4. fore wings with three submarginal cell.

== Biology ==
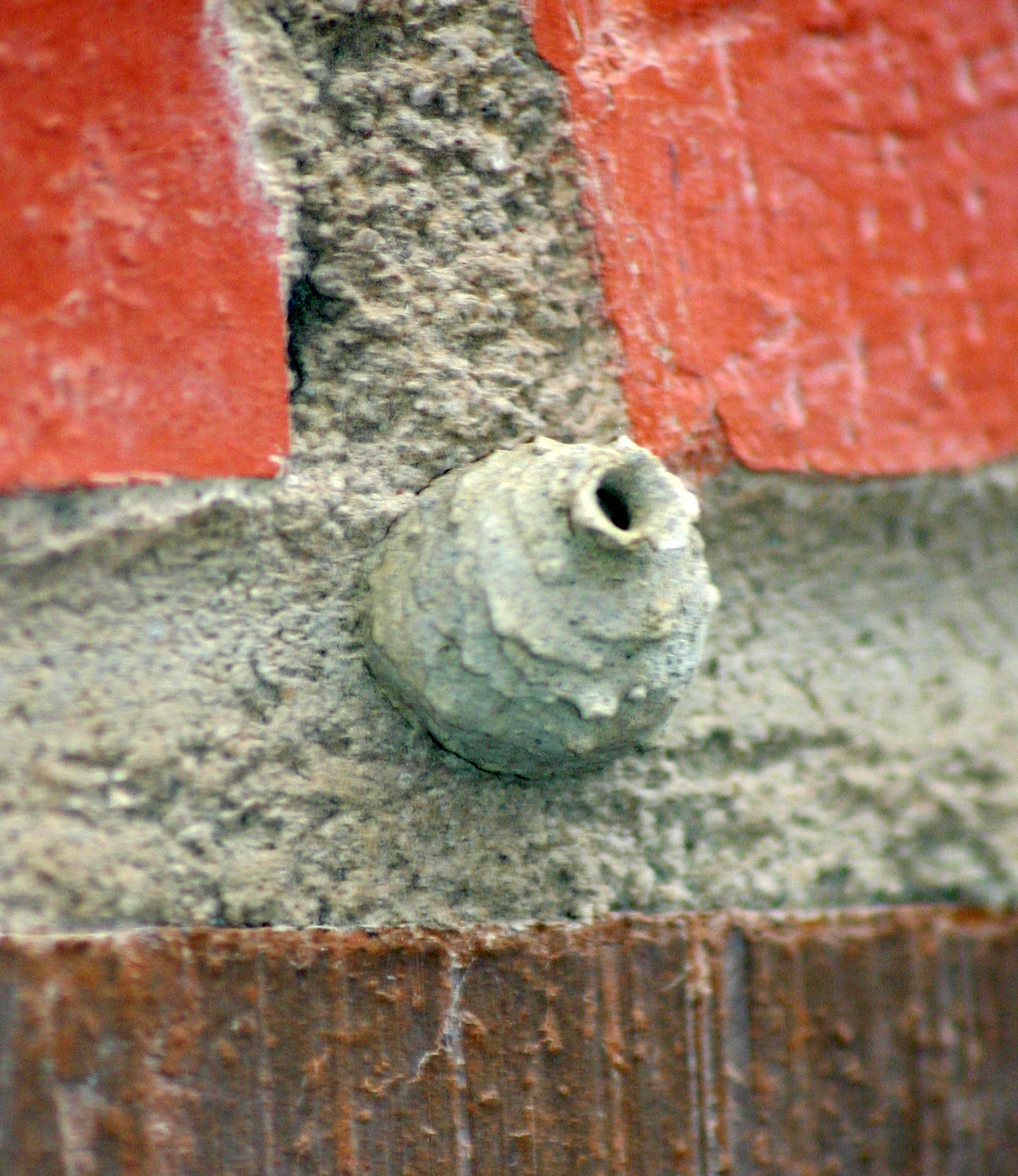
A potter wasp nest on a brick wall in coastal South Carolina

Eumenine wasps are diverse in nest building. The different species may either use existing cavities (such as beetle tunnels in wood, abandoned nests of other Hymenoptera, or even man-made holes like old nail holes and screw shafts on electronic devices) that they modify in several degrees, or they construct their own either underground or exposed nests. The nest may have one or several individual brood cells. The most widely used building material is mud made of a mixture of soil and regurgitated water, but many species instead use chewed plant material.

The name "potter wasp" derives from the shape of the mud nests built by species of Eumenes and similar genera. The female wasp scrapes up mud or dirt with her mandibles and front legs, combining it with water and saliva to form a mud ball she transports back to add to her nest under construction.

Potter wasp forming a mud ball.

All known eumenine species are predators, most of them solitary mass provisioners, though some isolated species show primitive states of social behaviour and progressive provisioning.

Potter wasp building a nest

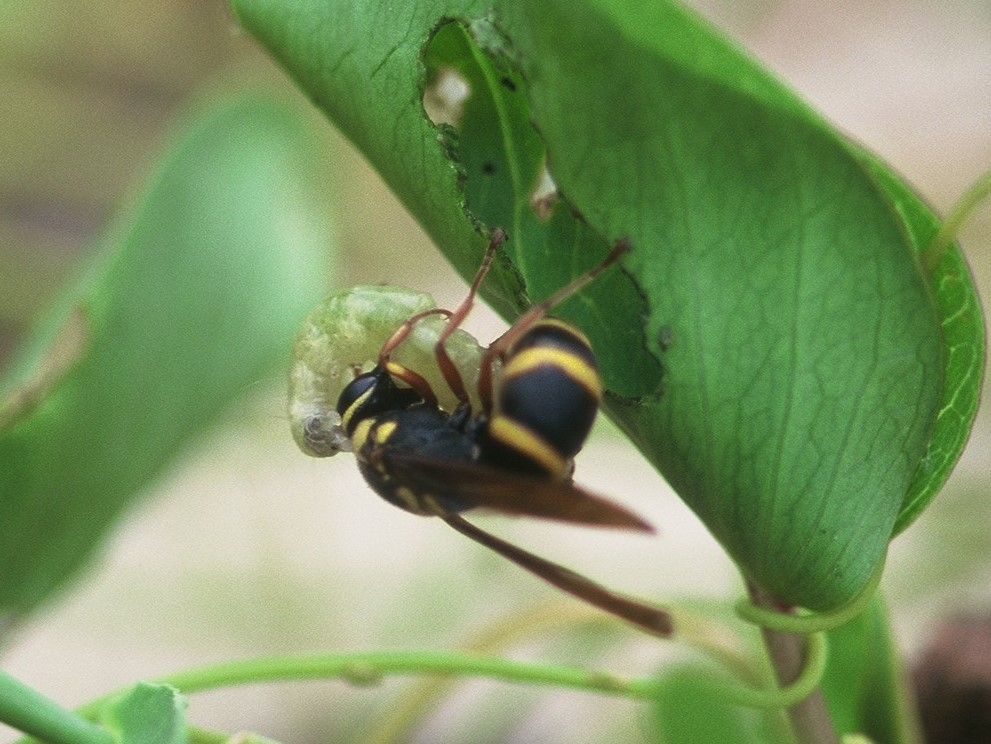
Potter wasp hunting a larva of moth

When a cell is completed, the adult wasp typically collects beetle larvae, spiders, or caterpillars and, paralyzing them, places them in the cell to serve as food for a single wasp larva. For example, Euodynerus foraminatus paralyzes the larvae of the poison hemlock moth (A. alstroemeriana). As a normal rule, the adult wasp lays a single egg in the empty cell before provisioning it. Some species lay the egg in the opening of the cell, suspended from a thread of dried fluid. When the wasp larva hatches, it drops and starts to feed upon the supplied prey for a few weeks before pupating. The complete lifecycle may last from a few weeks to more than a year from the egg until the adult emerges. Adult potter wasps feed on floral nectar.

== Taxonomy ==
Potter wasps are the most diverse subfamily of vespids, with almost 200 genera, and contain the vast majority of species in the family (nearly 3,000 species from a total of about 4,500 in the whole family). The overwhelming morphological diversity of the potter wasp species is reflected in the proliferation of genera described to group them into more manageable groups. The subfamily Zethinae was formerly included here, but was removed when it was recognized that it rendered Eumeninae paraphyletic.

== Gallery ==
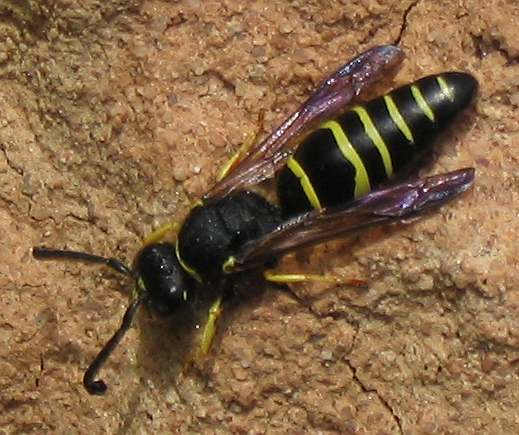
Odynerus spinipes male

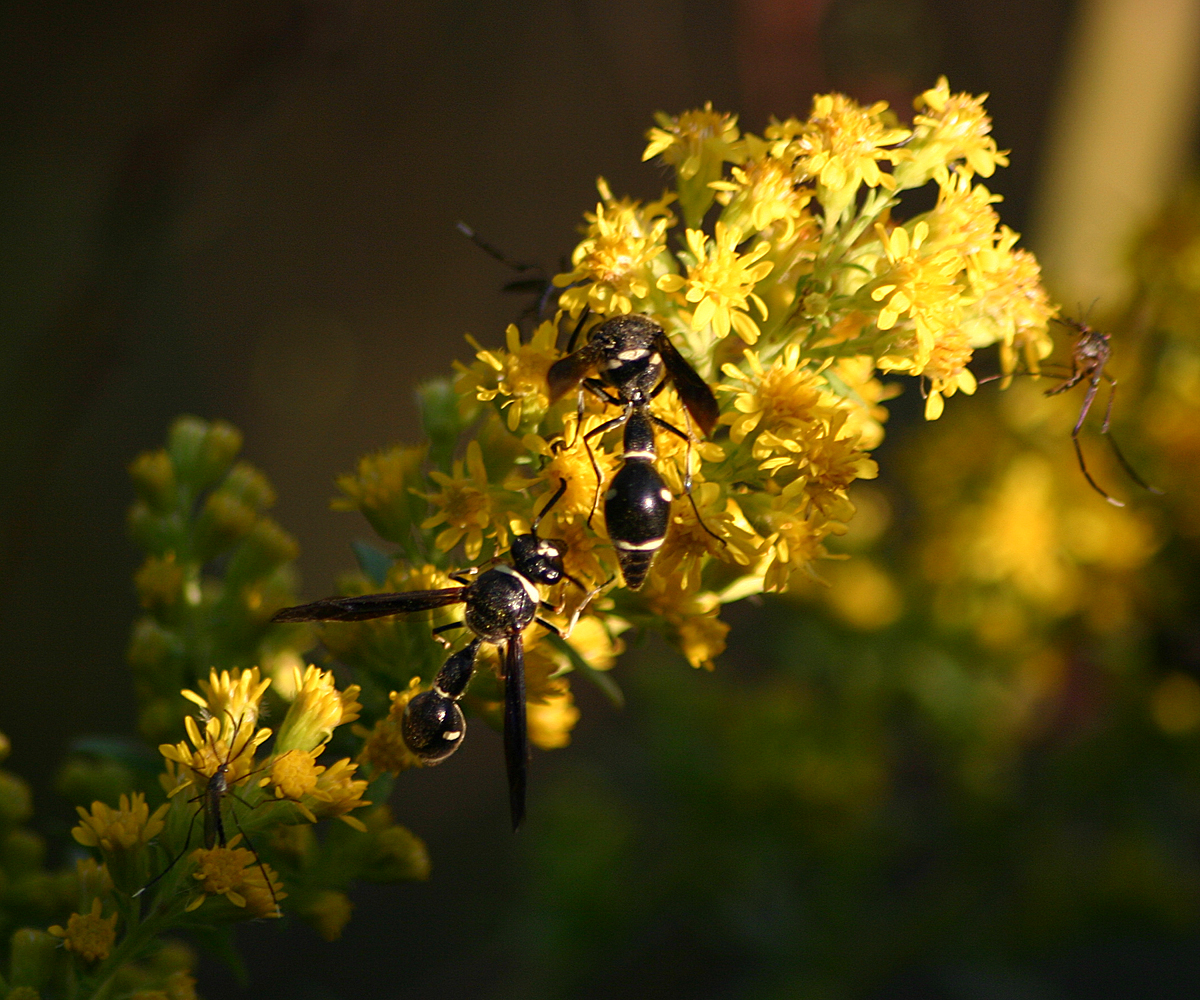
Eumenes fraternus in the United States

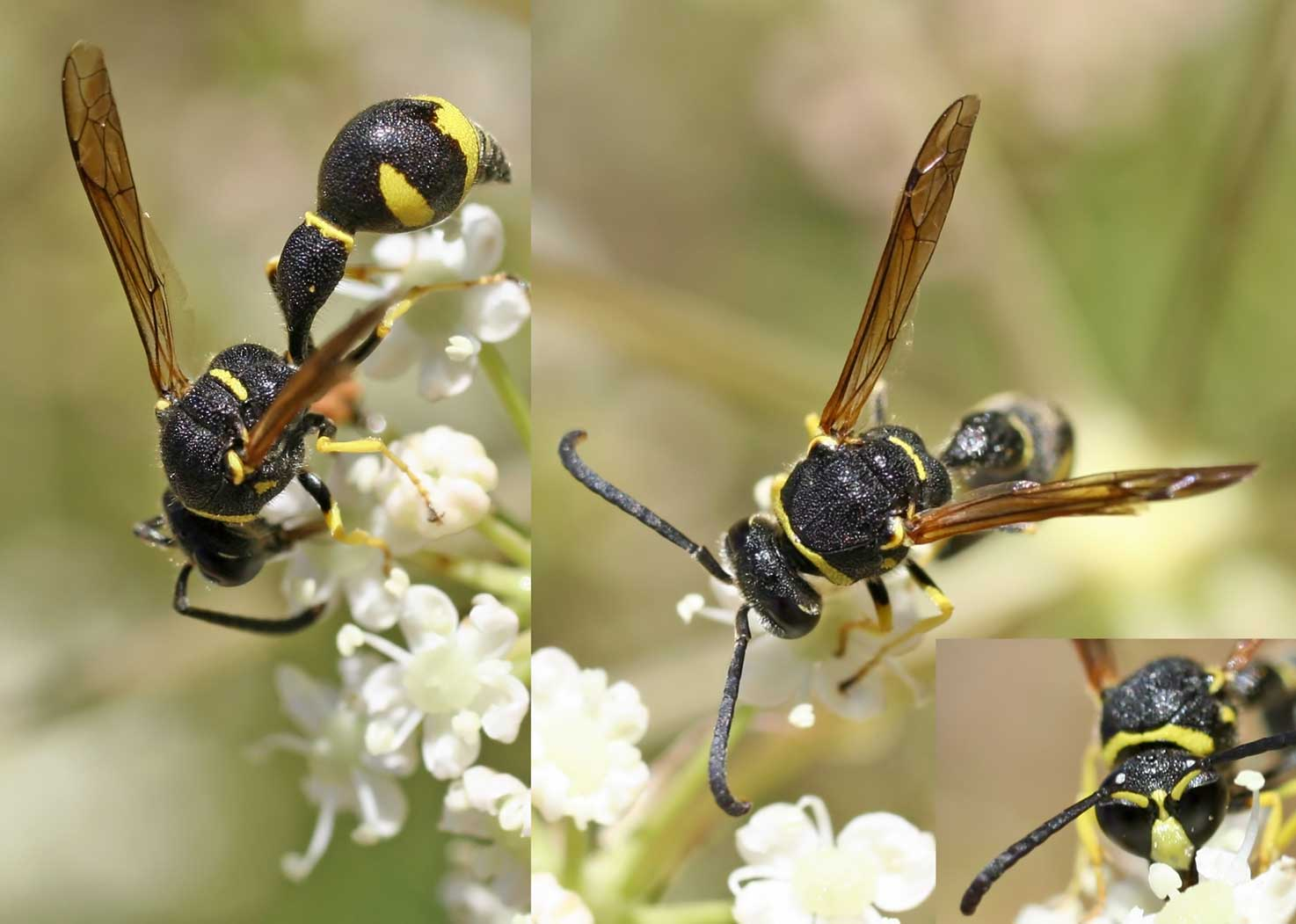
Eumenes pomiformis

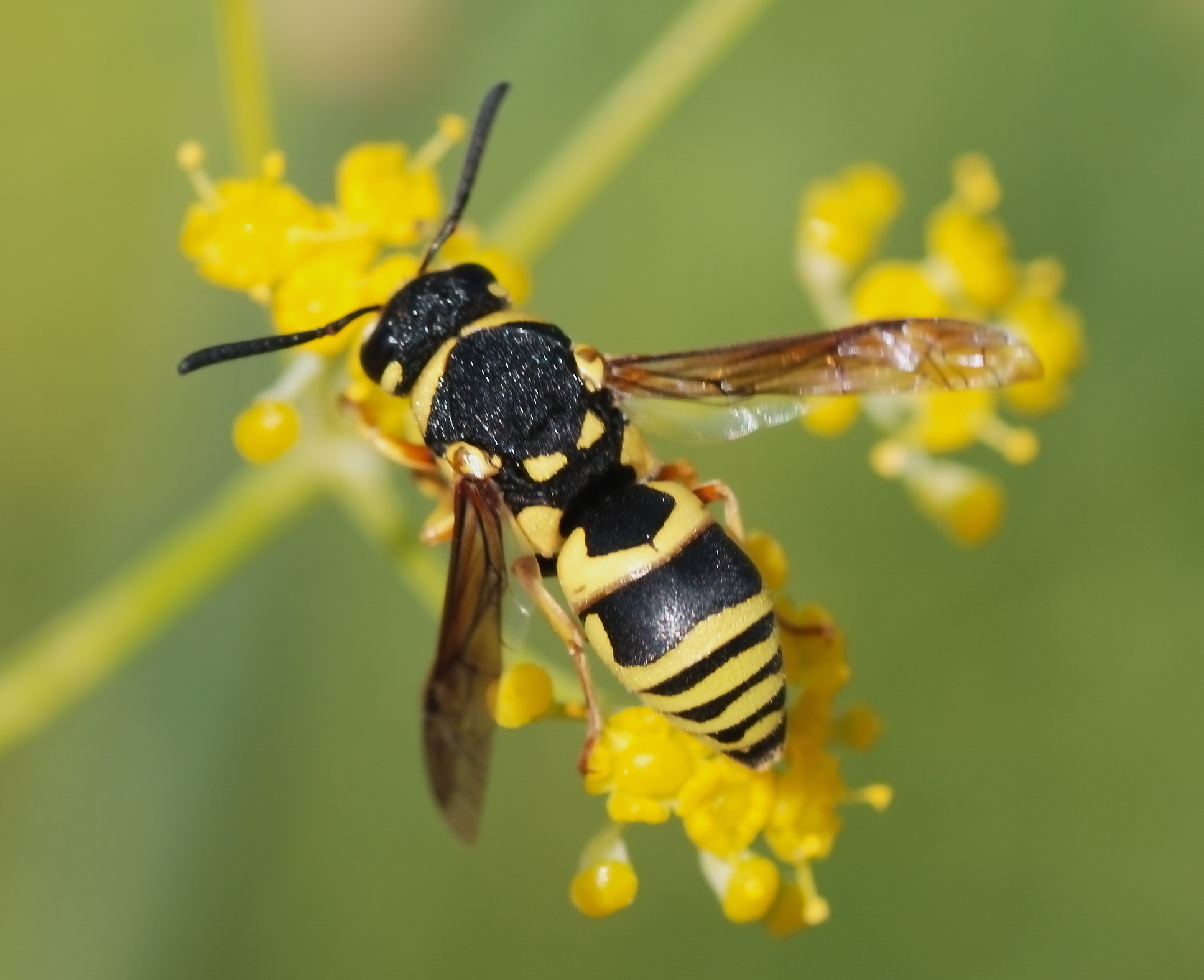
Euodynerus sp.

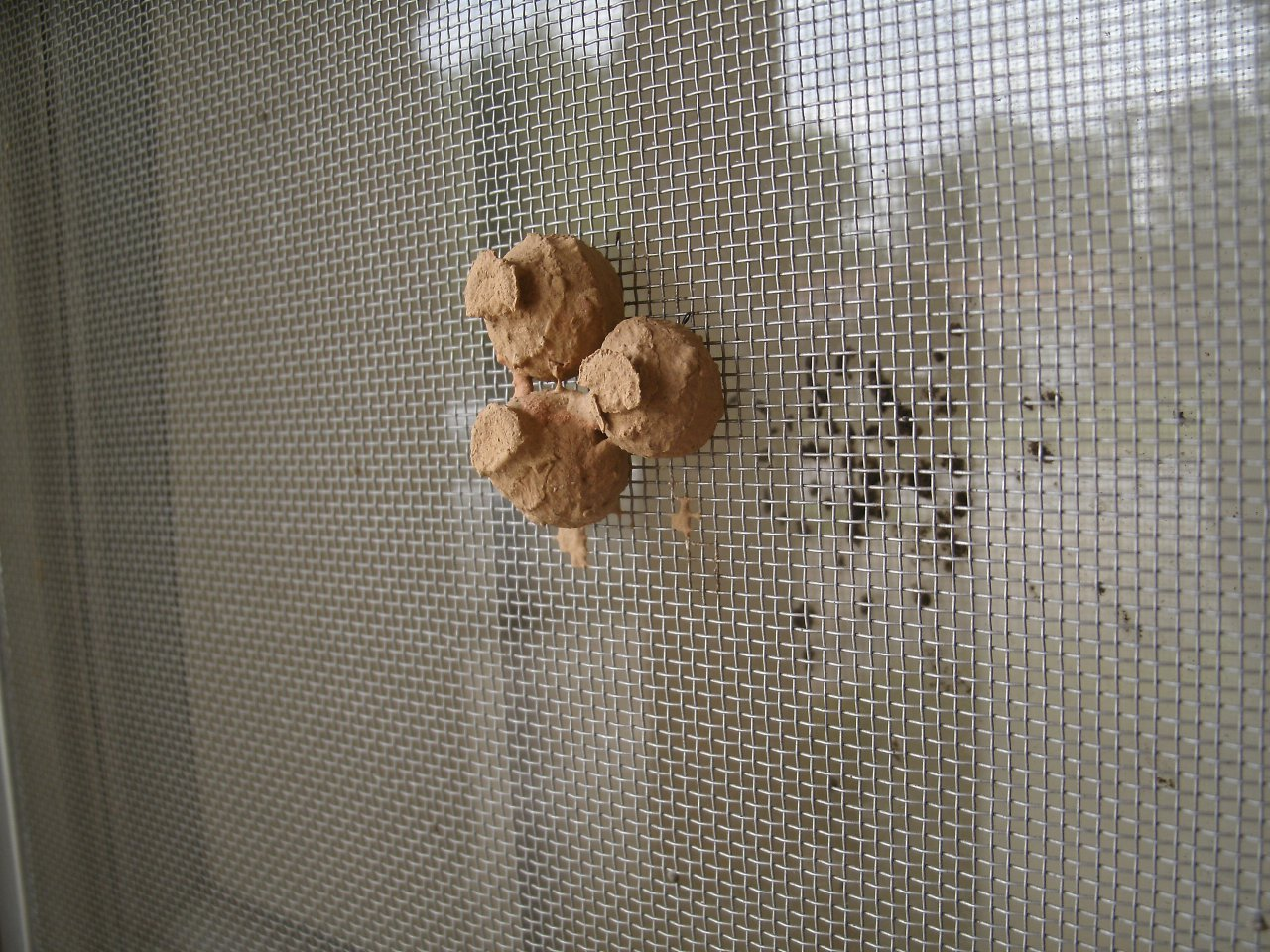
Potter wasp nests, Springdale, AR

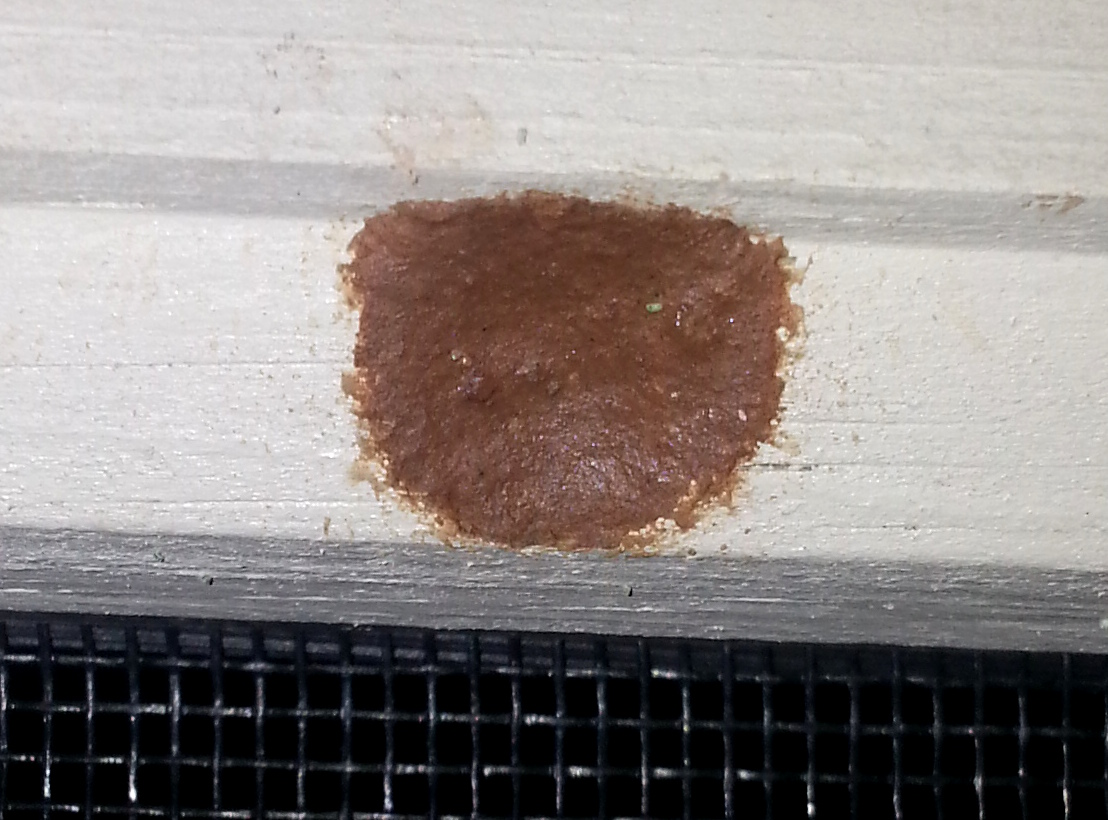
Pseudodynerus quadrisectus nest built in a hole bored by a carpenter bee

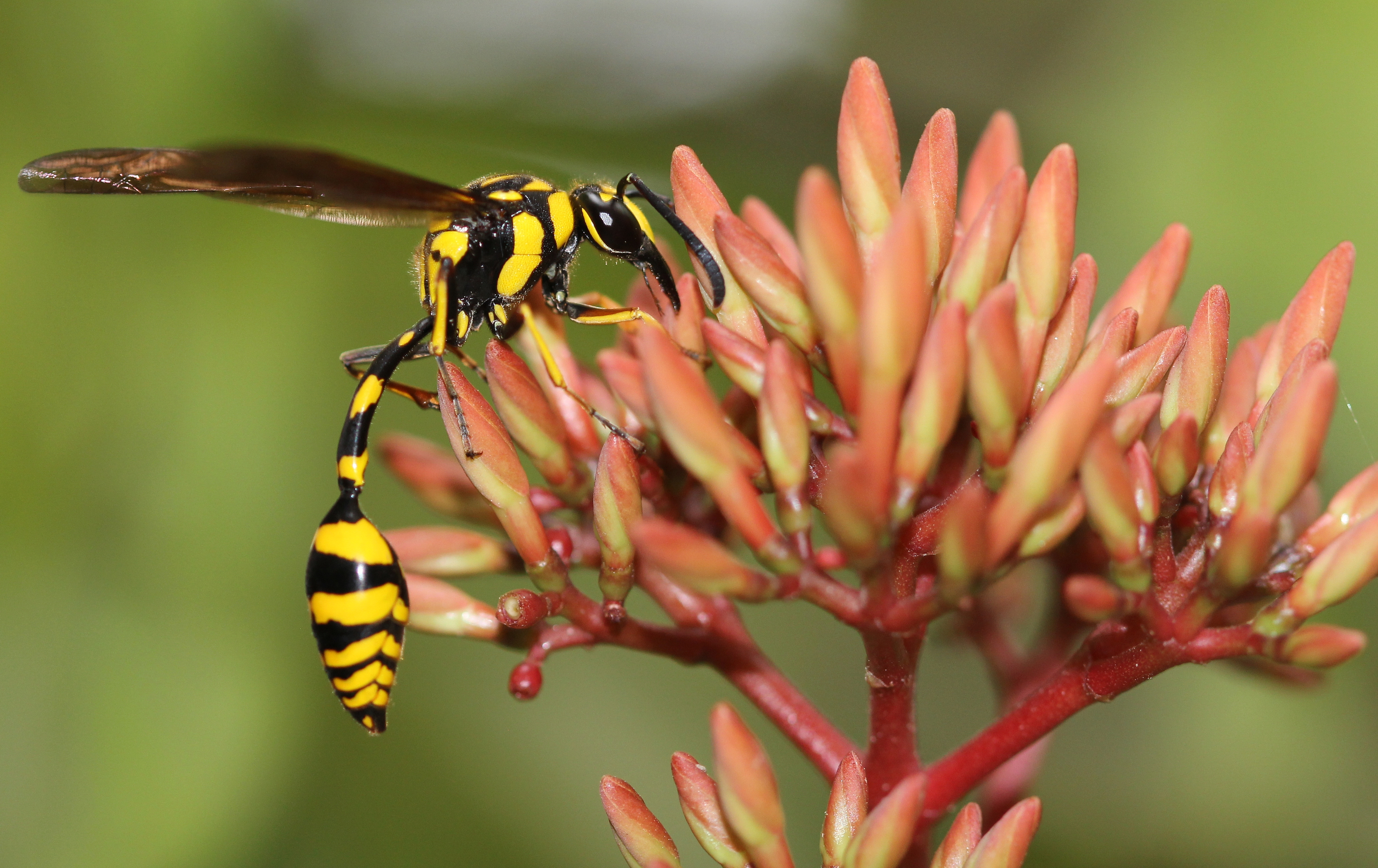
Phimenes flavopictus nectaring

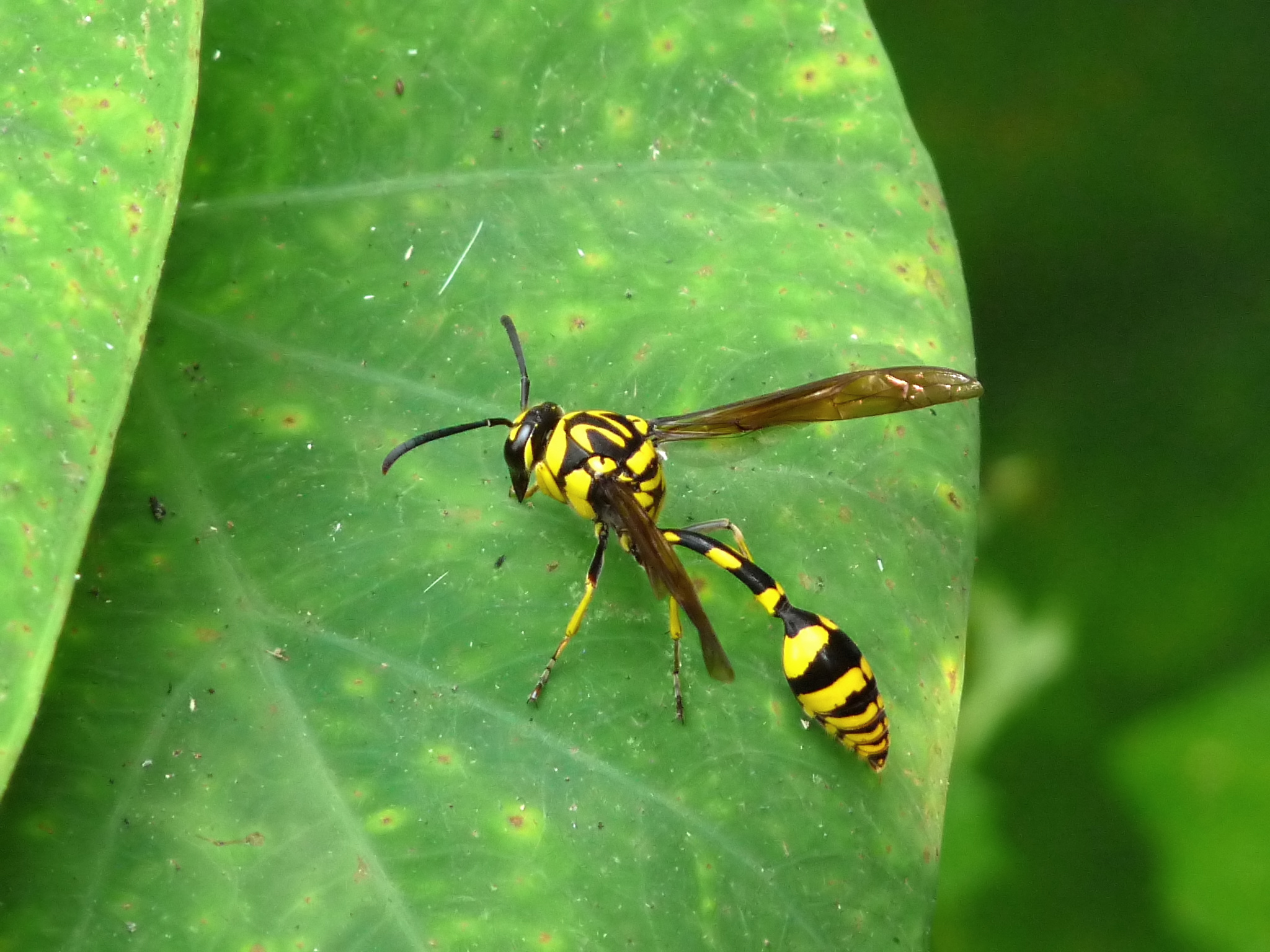
Phimenes flavopictus

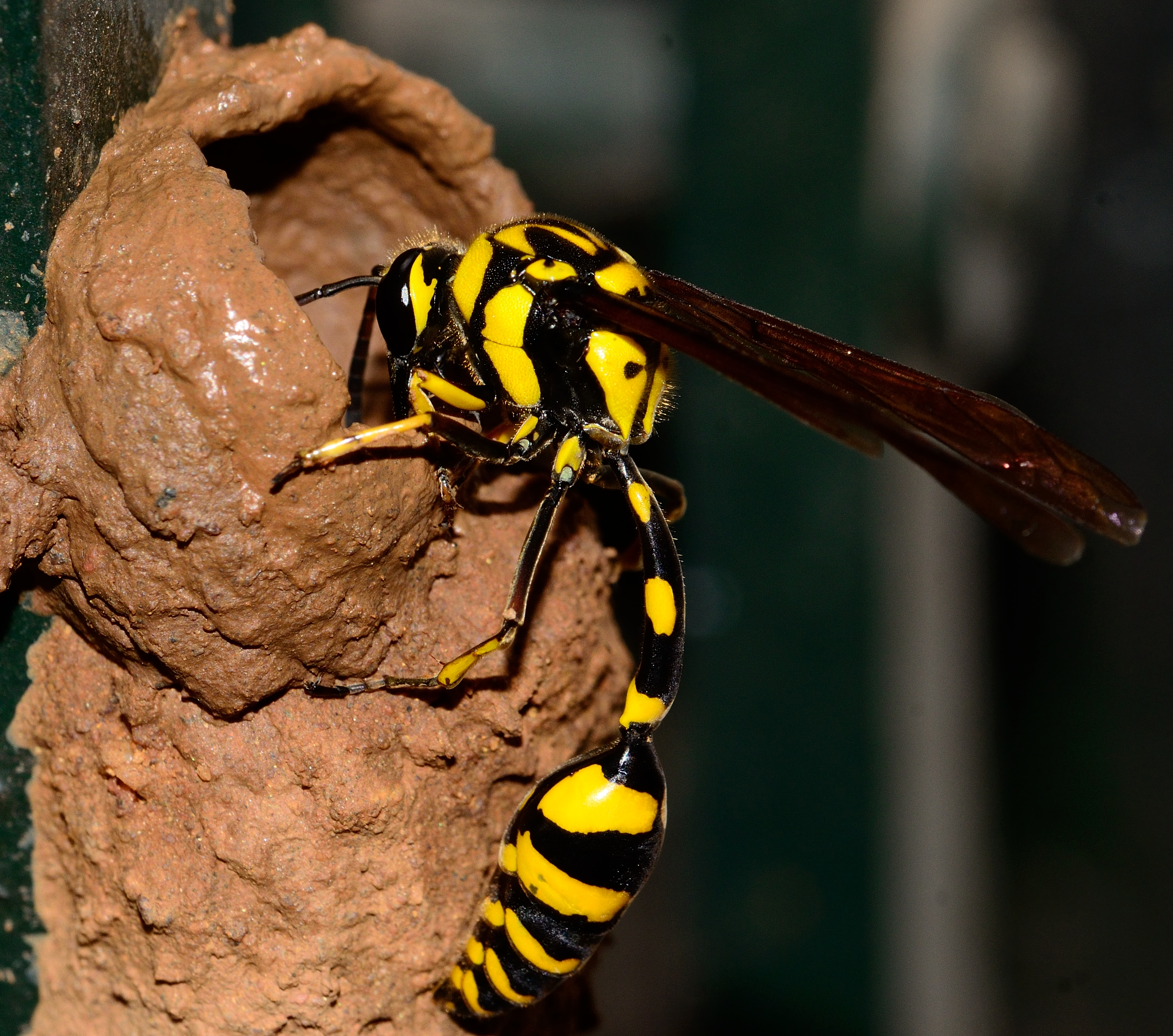
Phimenes flavopictus building nest

Four-toothed mason wasps (Monobia quadridens) nectaring on Canadian thistle

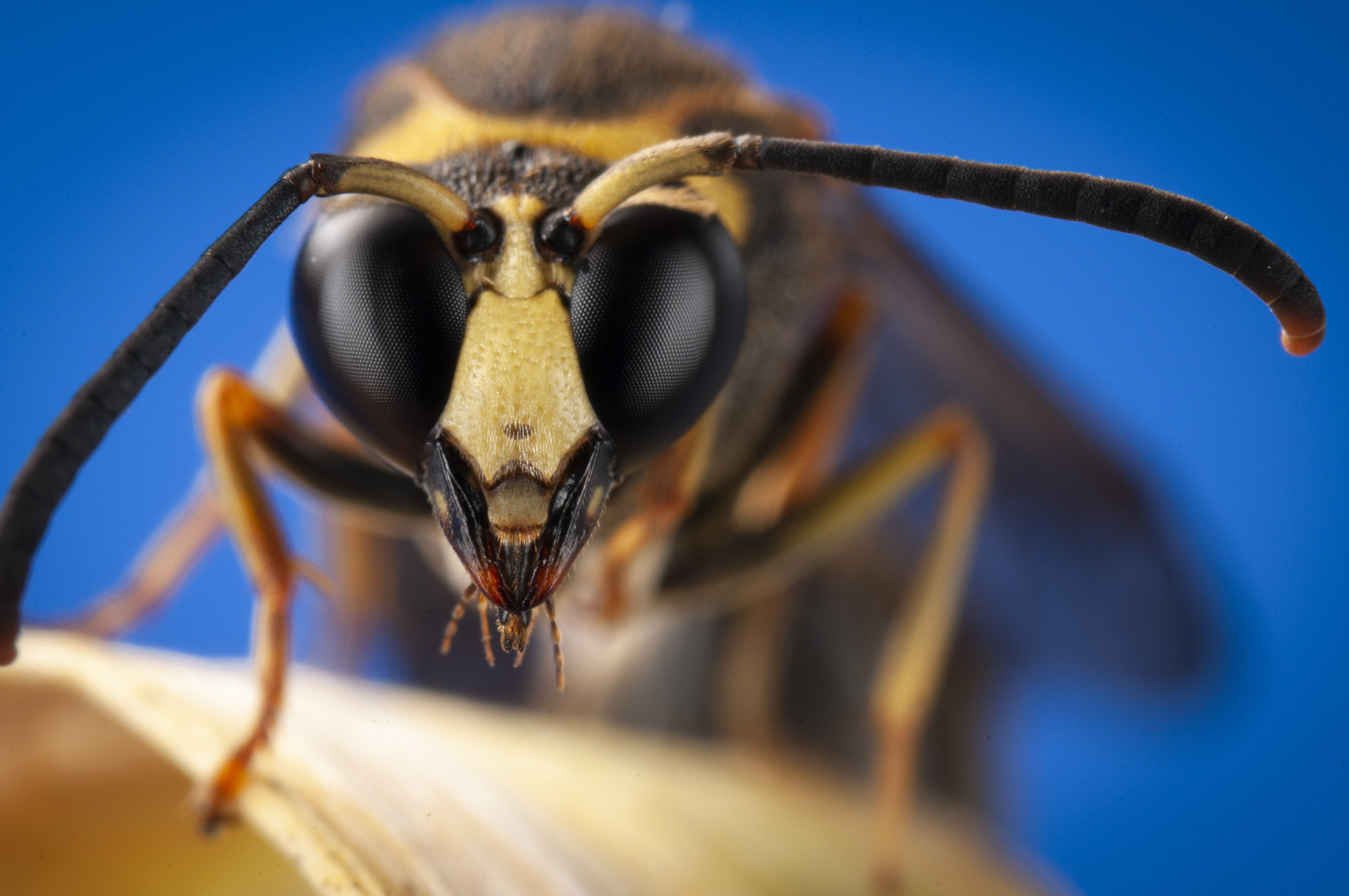
Eumenes sp. of South Korea

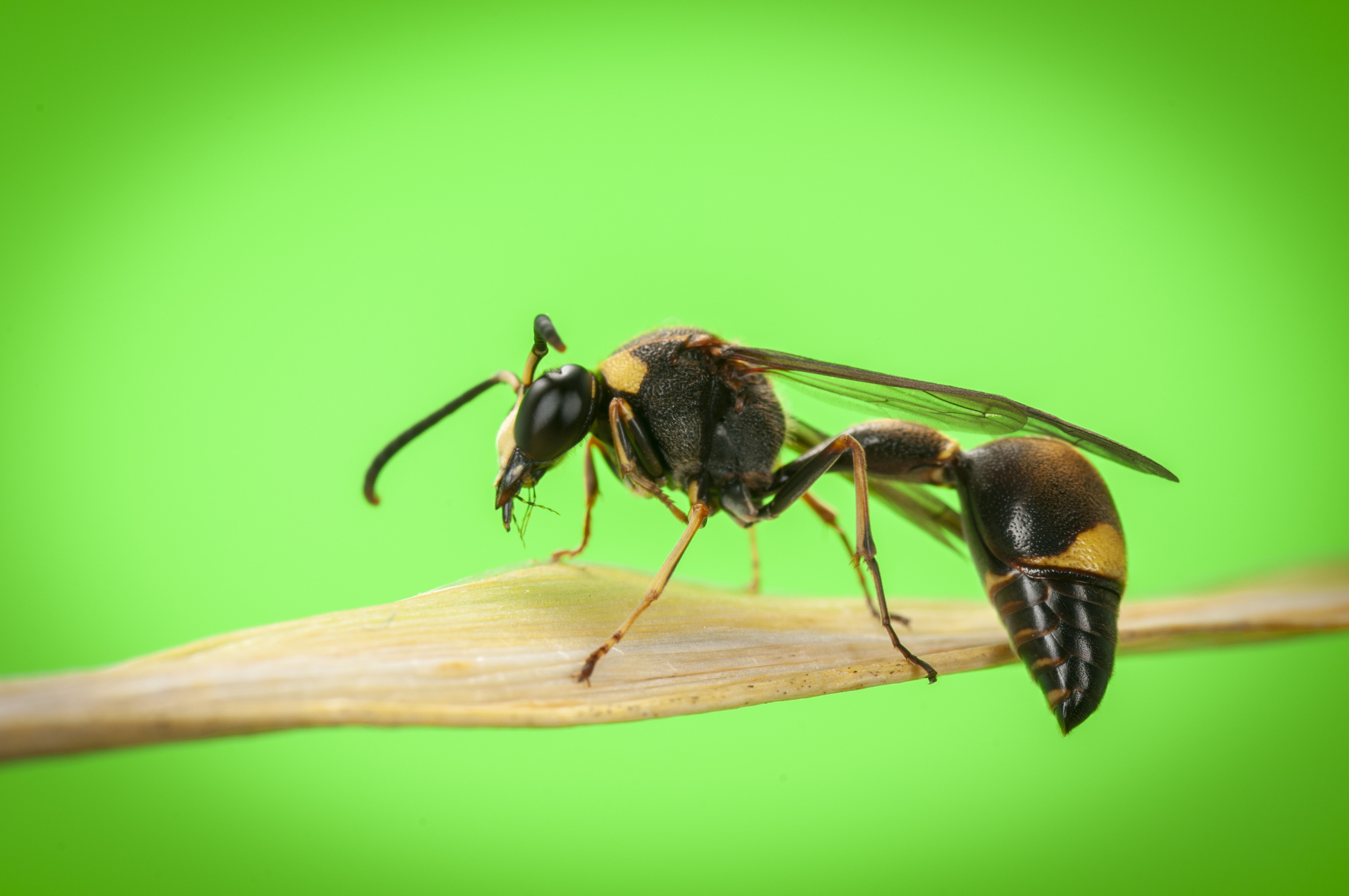
Eumenes sp. of South Korea
