= Leptomenes =

Scientific classification
- Domain: Eukaryota
- Kingdom: Animalia
- Phylum: Arthropoda
- Class: Insecta
- Order: Hymenoptera
- Family: Vespidae
- Subfamily: Eumeninae
- Genus: Leptomenes; Giordani Soika, 1939

Type species
- Pachymenes congensis Bequaert, 1918) as a synonym of Odynerus eumenoides Smith, 1857

Species
- See text

Genus of wasps

Leptomenes is a mainly Afrotropical genus of potter wasps. It was previously a much larger genus, though many species have been transferred to other genera such as Eumenidiopsis, Stroudia, and Tachymenes.

== Species ==
The following species are included in Leptomenes:

- Leptomenes baphomet Selis, 2020
- Leptomenes convexus Giordani Soika, 1987
- Leptomenes cribratus Giordani Soika, 1983
- Leptomenes eumenoides (Smith, 1857)
- Leptomenes laethificus Giordani Soika, 1941
- Leptomenes major Giordani Soika, 1977
- Leptomenes obliquepunctatus Selis, 2023
- Leptomenes pulawskii Gusenleitner, 1997
- Leptomenes richardsi Giordani Soika, 1975
- Leptomenes schulthessianus (de Saussure, 1890)
- Leptomenes stevensoni Giordani Soika, 1977
- Leptomenes ugandensis Giordani Soika, 1940
