= Allepipona =

Scientific classification
- Domain: Eukaryota
- Kingdom: Animalia
- Phylum: Arthropoda
- Class: Insecta
- Order: Hymenoptera
- Family: Vespidae
- Subfamily: Eumeninae
- Genus: Allepipona; Giordani Soika, 1987

Species
- See text

Genus of wasps

Allepipona is an Afrotropical genus of potter wasps.

== Species ==
The following species are included in the genus Allepipona:

- Allepipona erythrospila (Cameron, 1905) - Lesotho, South Africa and Zimbabwe
- Allepipona erythrura Giordani Soika, 1987 - Namibia
- Allepipona perspicax Giordani Soika, 1987 Democratic Republic of Congo, South Africa and Zimbabwe
- Allepipona schultzeana (von Schulthess, 1914) - (Namibia, South Africa)
- Allepipona emortualis (Saussure, 1853) - Ethiopia, Lesotho, Somalia, South Africa, Tanzania and Zimbabwe.
- Allepipona similis Gusenleitner, 2000 - Kenya and Tanzania
- Allepipona splendida Gusenleitner, 1997 - South Africa
