= List of Leptochilus species =

These 212 species belong to Leptochilus, a genus of potter and mason wasps in the family Vespidae.

== Leptochilus species ==
- Leptochilus acapulcoensis (Cameron, 1907)^{c g}
- Leptochilus acolhuus (de Saussure, 1857)^{c g b}
- Leptochilus admimulus Gusenleitner, 1993^{c g}
- Leptochilus aegineticus Gusenleitner, 1970^{c g}
- Leptochilus alborufulus Gusenleitner, 1977^{c g}
- Leptochilus alpestris (de Saussure, 1856)^{c g}
- Leptochilus alterego Gusenleitner, 1970^{c g}
- Leptochilus ambiguus (Kostylev, 1940)^{c g}
- Leptochilus ambitiosus Giordani Soika, 1986^{c g}
- Leptochilus amos Gusenleitner, 1972^{c g}
- Leptochilus andalusicus Blüthgen, 1953^{c g}
- Leptochilus anthracinus Parker, 1966^{c g}
- Leptochilus arabicus Giordani Soika, 1979^{c g}
- Leptochilus argentifrons (Kostylev, 1935)^{c g}
- Leptochilus aridulus Parker, 1966^{c g}
- Leptochilus aterrimus (Kirby, 1900)^{c g}
- Leptochilus atlanticus Berland, 1943^{c g}
- Leptochilus atriceps Gusenleitner, 1977^{c g}
- Leptochilus atroscutellatus Giordani Soika, 1952^{c g}
- Leptochilus autumnus Parker, 1966^{c g}
- Leptochilus avidus Giordani Soika, 1986^{c g}
- Leptochilus ayunensis Giordani Soika, 1981^{c g}
- Leptochilus beaumonti Giordani Soika, 1952^{c g}
- Leptochilus bellulus (Cresson, 1872)^{c g b}
- Leptochilus bellus Blüthgen, 1955^{c g}
- Leptochilus biangulatus Gusenleitner, 1977^{c g}
- Leptochilus boharti Parker, 1966^{c g}
- Leptochilus brachialis Parker, 1966^{c g}
- Leptochilus brussiloffi (Dusmet, 1917)^{c g}
- Leptochilus bulsamensis Blüthgen, 1955^{c g}
- Leptochilus bytinskii Giordani Soika, 1952^{c g}
- Leptochilus cacaloa Parker, 1966^{c g}
- Leptochilus californicus Parker, 1966^{c g}
- Leptochilus callidus (Kostylev, 1940)^{c g}
- Leptochilus camurus (Giordani Soika, 1938)^{c g}
- Leptochilus castilianus Blüthgen, 1951^{c g}
- Leptochilus chichimecus (de Saussure, 1857)^{c g}
- Leptochilus chinenesis Gusenleitner, 2001^{c g}
- Leptochilus chinensis Gusenleitner, 2001^{c g}
- Leptochilus chiricahua Parker, 1966^{c g}
- Leptochilus chorezmicus (Kostylev, 1940)^{c g}
- Leptochilus conjunctus Gusenleitner, 1998^{c g}
- Leptochilus covexus Giordani Soika, 1987^{c g}
- Leptochilus crassiceps (Kostylev, 1940)^{c g}
- Leptochilus crassipunctatus (Maidl, 1922)^{c g}
- Leptochilus crocatus Parker, 1966^{c g}
- Leptochilus cruentatus (Brullé, 1840)^{c g}
- Leptochilus desertus Gusenleitner, 2001^{c g}
- Leptochilus discedens Gusenleitner, 1983^{c g}
- Leptochilus dolius Parker, 1966^{c g}
- Leptochilus duplicatus (Klug, 1835)^{c g}
- Leptochilus eatoni (E.Saundas, 1905)^{c}
- Leptochilus ebmeri Gusenleitner, 1985^{c g}
- Leptochilus eburneopictus (Kostylev, 1935)^{c g}
- Leptochilus electus (Cresson, 1872)^{c g}
- Leptochilus ellenae Parker, 1966^{c g}
- Leptochilus elongatus Parker, 1966^{c g}
- Leptochilus emirufulus Giordani Soika, 1986^{c g}
- Leptochilus ergenicus (Kostylev, 1940)^{c g}
- Leptochilus errabundus (Giordani Soika, 1938)^{c g}
- Leptochilus erubescens (Bohart, 1940)^{c g}
- Leptochilus euleptochiloides Giordani Soika, 1977^{c g}
- Leptochilus exornatus Kurzenko, 1974^{c g}
- Leptochilus fallax (de Saussure, 1852)^{c}
- Leptochilus ferrugineus Parker, 1966^{c g}
- Leptochilus festae (Gribodo, 1925)^{c g}
- Leptochilus flavicornis Giordani Soika, 1970^{c g}
- Leptochilus flegias (Giordani Soika, 1938)^{c g}
- Leptochilus flexilis (Giordani Soika, 1938)^{c g}
- Leptochilus fortunatus Blüthgen, 1958^{c g}
- Leptochilus frenchi (Dusmet)^{c g}
- Leptochilus fuscipes Gusenleitner, 1985^{c g}
- Leptochilus gayuboi Sanza 2003^{c g}
- Leptochilus gemma Giordani Soika, 1970^{c g}
- Leptochilus gemmeus (Giordani Soika, 1941)^{c g}
- Leptochilus genalis (Giordani Soika, 1941)^{c g}
- Leptochilus gibberus Parker, 1966^{c g}
- Leptochilus gobicus (Kostylev, 1940)^{c g}
- Leptochilus guichardi Giordani Soika, 1973^{c g}
- Leptochilus gusenleitneri Yilderim & Özbeck, 1995^{c g}
- Leptochilus habyrganus Kurzenko, 1977^{c g}
- Leptochilus hermon Gusenleitner, 1972^{c g}
- Leptochilus hesperius Gusenleitner, 1979^{c g}
- Leptochilus hethiticus Gusenleitner, 1985^{c g}
- Leptochilus hina (Dover, 1925)^{c g}
- Leptochilus humerus Parker, 1966^{c g}
- Leptochilus ibizanus (Schulthess, 1934)^{c g}
- Leptochilus imerolatus Gusenleitner 2006^{c g}
- Leptochilus immodestus (Giordani Soika, 1941)^{c g}
- Leptochilus incertus (Kostylev, 1940)^{c g}
- Leptochilus inflatipes Giordani Soika, 1952^{c g}
- Leptochilus innatus Giordani Soika, 1970^{c g}
- Leptochilus insitivus Gusenleitner, 1976^{c g}
- Leptochilus insolitus Gusenleitner, 2003^{c g}
- Leptochilus irwini Parker, 1966^{c g}
- Leptochilus isthmus Parker, 1966^{c g}
- Leptochilus jaxarticus (Kostylev, 1940)^{c g}
- Leptochilus jordaneus Gusenleitner, 1994^{c g}
- Leptochilus josephi Giordani Soika, 1947^{c g}
- Leptochilus kemali Gusenleitner, 1977^{c g}
- Leptochilus kostylevi Kurzenko, 1979^{c g}
- Leptochilus kozlovi Kurzenko, 1977^{c g}
- Leptochilus krombeini Parker, 1966^{c g}
- Leptochilus kurnubensis Blüthgen, 1955^{c g}
- Leptochilus labrosus Parker, 1966^{c g}
- Leptochilus lemniscatus Parker, 1966^{c g}
- Leptochilus leopoldoi Sanza 2003^{c g}
- Leptochilus levinodus Bohart, 1948^{c g}
- Leptochilus limbiferoides (Giordani Soika, 1938)^{c g}
- Leptochilus limbiferus (Moravitz, 1867)^{c g}
- Leptochilus linsenmaieri Gusenleitner, 1971^{c g}
- Leptochilus locuples Giordani Soika, 1970^{c g}
- Leptochilus longipalpus Gusenleitner, 1985^{c g}
- Leptochilus longipilis Gusenleitner, 1988^{c g}
- Leptochilus lorestanicus Gusenleitner, 1995^{c g}
- Leptochilus lucidus (Giordani Soika, 1941)^{c g}
- Leptochilus lusitanicus Blüthgen, 1953^{c g}
- Leptochilus maracandicus (Kostylev, 1940)^{c g}
- Leptochilus marshi Parker, 1966^{c g}
- Leptochilus masiharensis Giordani Soika, 1981^{c g}
- Leptochilus mauritanicus (Lepeletier, 1841)^{c}
- Leptochilus medanae (Gribodo, 1886)^{c g}
- Leptochilus membranaceus (Moravitz, 1867)^{c g}
- Leptochilus menkei Parker, 1966^{c g}
- Leptochilus mesolobus Parker, 1966^{c g}
- Leptochilus metatarsalis Giordani Soika, 1986^{c g}
- Leptochilus michelbacheri (Bohart, 1948)^{c g}
- Leptochilus milleri Parker, 1966^{c g}
- Leptochilus mimulus Gusenleitner, 1970^{c g}
- Leptochilus minutissimus (Bohart, 1940)^{c g}
- Leptochilus mirandus Giordani Soika^{c g}
- Leptochilus mirificus Gusenleitner 2006^{c g}
- Leptochilus mixtecus Parker, 1966^{c g}
- Leptochilus mochianus Giordani Soika, 1970^{c g}
- Leptochilus modestus (de Saussure, 1852)^{c g}
- Leptochilus monticolus Parker, 1966^{c g}
- Leptochilus montivagus Gusenleitner, 2002^{c g}
- Leptochilus moustiersensis Giordani Soika, 1973^{c g}
- Leptochilus moustirsensis Giordani Soika, 1973^{g}
- Leptochilus muscatensis Giordani Soika, 1979^{c g}
- Leptochilus nabataeus Gusenleitner, 1990^{c g}
- Leptochilus nahuus (de Saussure, 1870)^{c g}
- Leptochilus neutraliformis Gusenleitner, 1977^{c g}
- Leptochilus neutralis (Giordani Soika, 1943)^{c g}
- Leptochilus nigrocitrinus Giordani Soika, 1970^{c g}
- Leptochilus nigroclypeus Gusenleitner, 1985^{c g}
- Leptochilus nigromontanus (Kostylev, 1940)^{c g}
- Leptochilus nugdunensis (de Saussure)^{c g}
- Leptochilus occidentalis Giordani Soika, 1986^{c g}
- Leptochilus occultus Gusenleitner, 2003^{c g}
- Leptochilus oculatus Parker, 1966^{c g}
- Leptochilus olmecus (de Saussure, 1870)^{c g}
- Leptochilus oraniensis (Lepeletier, 1841)^{c g}
- Leptochilus ornatulus Gusenleitner, 1977^{c g}
- Leptochilus ornatus (de Saussure, 1853)^{c}
- Leptochilus osiris (Schmiedeknecht, 1900)^{c g}
- Leptochilus osmanicus Gusenleitner, 1988^{c g}
- Leptochilus oxianus (Kostylev, 1940)^{c g}
- Leptochilus pachuca Parker, 1966^{c g}
- Leptochilus paiute Parker, 1966^{c g}
- Leptochilus palandokenicus Yilderim & Özbeck, 1995^{c g}
- Leptochilus perialis Parker, 1966^{c g}
- Leptochilus perterricus Giordani Soika, 1970^{c g}
- Leptochilus perterritus Giordani Soika^{c g}
- Leptochilus petilus Parker, 1966^{c g}
- Leptochilus praestans Giordani Soika, 1970^{c g}
- Leptochilus propodealis Bohart, 1948^{c g}
- Leptochilus pseudojosephi Giordani Soika, 1952^{c g}
- Leptochilus pulcher Gusenleitner, 1995^{c g}
- Leptochilus quintus Gusenleitner, 1991^{c g}
- Leptochilus quirogae Parker, 1966^{c g}
- Leptochilus radoschowskii (André, 1884)^{c g}
- Leptochilus ratzenboecki Gusenleitner, 1994^{c g}
- Leptochilus regulus (de Saussure, 1856)^{c g}
- Leptochilus replenus Giordani Soika, 1974^{c g}
- Leptochilus republicanus Gusenleitner, 2006^{b}
- Leptochilus ressli Gusenleitner, 1985^{c g}
- Leptochilus rivalis Giordani Soika, 1986^{c g}
- Leptochilus rotundipunctis Giordani Soika 1977^{c g}
- Leptochilus rubellulus (Kohl, 1906)^{c g}
- Leptochilus rubicundulus (Bohart, 1940)^{c g}
- Leptochilus rufina Blüthgen, 1953^{c g}
- Leptochilus rufinodus (Cresson, 1868)^{c g b}
- Leptochilus salomon Gusenleitner, 1972^{c g}
- Leptochilus sarticus Blüthgen, 1939^{c g}
- Leptochilus schatzmayri (Giordani Soika, 1938)^{c g}
- Leptochilus schindleri (Guiglia, 1929)^{c g}
- Leptochilus sewerzowi (Kostylev, 1940)^{c g}
- Leptochilus signatus Gusenleitner, 1995^{c g}
- Leptochilus somalicus Giordani Soika, 1987^{c g}
- Leptochilus sonorae Parker, 1966^{c g}
- Leptochilus speciosus Gusenleitner, 2002^{c g}
- Leptochilus stangei Parker, 1966^{c g}
- Leptochilus subtarsatellus Gusenleitner, 2002^{c g}
- Leptochilus tarsatellus Giordani Soika, 1970^{c g}
- Leptochilus tarsatiformis (Giordani Soika, 1943)^{c g}
- Leptochilus tarsatus (de Saussure, 1855)^{c g}
- Leptochilus tassiliensis Giordani Soika, 1954^{c g}
- Leptochilus tertius Gusenleitner, 1990^{c g}
- Leptochilus tibetanus Giordani Soika, 1966^{c g}
- Leptochilus torretassoi (Giordani Soika, 1938)^{c}
- Leptochilus tosquineti (Cameron, 1909)^{c g}
- Leptochilus trachysomus (Bohart, 1940)^{c}
- Leptochilus tropicanus Parker, 1966^{c g}
- Leptochilus tuareg Gusenleitner 2006^{c g}
- Leptochilus tussaci Giordani Soika, 1986^{c g}
- Leptochilus umerolatus Gusenleitner, 2006^{g}
- Leptochilus villosus Gusenleitner, 2001^{c g}
- Leptochilus washo Parker, 1966^{c g}
- Leptochilus weddigeni (Dusmet, 1917)^{c g}
- Leptochilus zacatecus Parker, 1966^{c g}
- Leptochilus zendalus (de Saussure, 1870)^{c}

Data sources: i = ITIS, c = Catalogue of Life, g = GBIF, b = Bugguide.net
