= Pseudalastor =

Scientific classification
- Domain: Eukaryota
- Kingdom: Animalia
- Phylum: Arthropoda
- Class: Insecta
- Order: Hymenoptera
- Family: Vespidae
- Subfamily: Eumeninae
- Genus: Pseudalastor; Giordani Soika, 1978

Type species
- Pseudalastor concolor (Saussure, 1853)

Species
- See text

Genus of wasps

Pseudalastor is an Australian genus of potter wasps.

== Species ==
The following species are included in Pseudalastor:

- Pseudalastor anguloides Giordani Soika, 1962
- Pseudalastor carpenter Borsato, 2003
- Pseudalastor cavifemur Giordani Soika, 1962
- Pseudalastor chloroticus Borsato, 1994
- Pseudalastor concolor (Saussure, 1853)
- Pseudalastor houstoni Borsato, 1994
- Pseudalastor lamellatus Giordani Soika, 1993
- Pseudalastor metathoracicus (Saussure, 1855)
- Pseudalastor superbus Giordani Soika, 1977
- Pseudalastor tridentatus (Schulthess-Rechberg, 1935)
- Pseudalastor xanthozonellus Vecht, 1981
