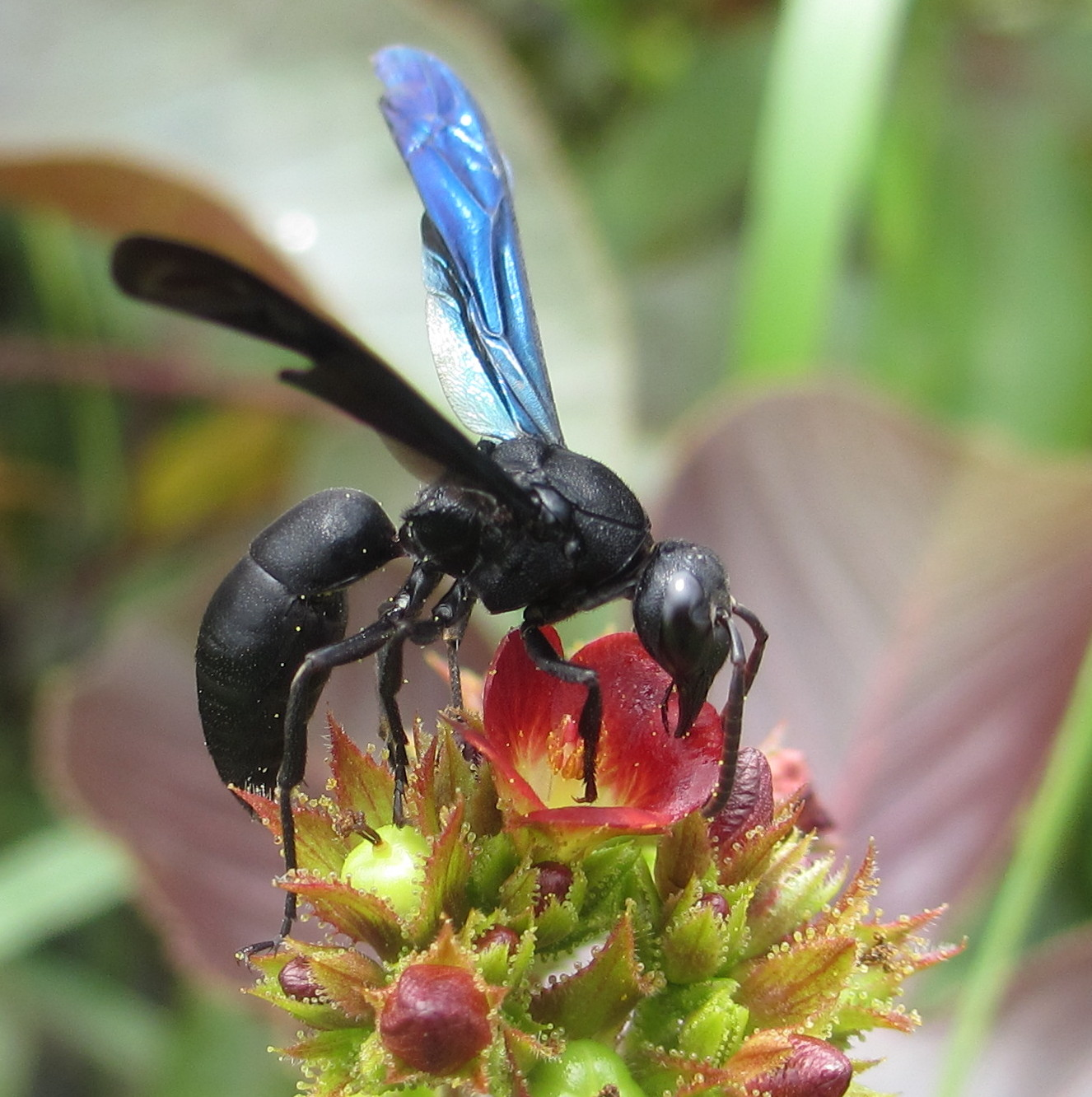
- Anterhynchium fallax on Jatropha gossypiifolia

Scientific classification
- Domain: Eukaryota
- Kingdom: Animalia
- Phylum: Arthropoda
- Class: Insecta
- Order: Hymenoptera
- Family: Vespidae
- Subfamily: Eumeninae
- Genus: Anterhynchium; Saussure, 1863

Type species
- Rygchium synagroides de Saussure, 1852

= Anterhynchium =

Genus of wasps

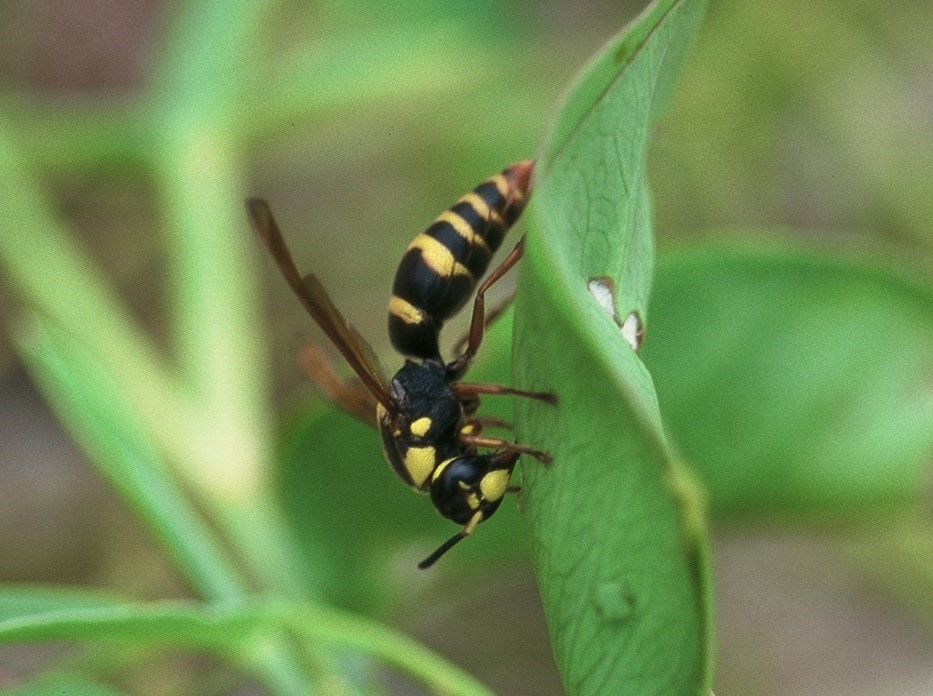
Anterhynchium flavomarginatum umenoi. A female searching a caterpillar of moth. Iriomote Is., Japan

Anterhynchium is an Afrotropical, Indomalayan, Australian and Palearctic genus of potter wasps. As in many species of wasp, female wasps defend against predation using a modified ovipositor to sting predators. Like some other wasps in the Vespidae family, male wasps can produce a "pseudo-sting" with two sharp spines on either side of their genitals; however, unlike in the females, this "sting" is venomless.

== Species ==
The following species are classified within the genus Anterhynchium:

- Anterhynchium abdominale (Illiger, 1802)
- Anterhynchium aestuans Saussure, 1863
- Anterhynchium alecto (Lepeletier, 1841)
- Anterhynchium andreanum (de Saussure, 1890)
- Anterhynchium argenteopilosellum (Giordani Soika, 1937)
- Anterhynchium astrophilum Giordani Soika, 1996
- Anterhynchium auromaculatum (de Saussure, 1852)
- Anterhynchium basimacula (Cameron, 1897)
- Anterhynchium bugandanum Giordani Soika, 1987)
- Anterhynchium cariosum Giordani Soika, 1987
- Anterhynchium coracinum Vecht, 1963
- Anterhynchium decoratum (de Saussure, 1856)
- Anterhynchium denticulatum (Mocsáry, 1903)
- Anterhynchium fallax (de Saussure, 1855)
- Anterhynchium flavolineatum (Smith, 1857)
- Anterhynchium flavomarginatum Smith, 1852
- Anterhynchium flavopunctatum Smith, 1852
- Anterhynchium fulvipenne Smith, 1859
- Anterhynchium gibbifrons Yamane et Murota 2015
- Anterhynchium grandidieri (de Saussure, 1890)
- Anterhynchium grayi (de Saussure, 1853)
- Anterhynchium hamatum Vecht, 1963
- Anterhynchium inamurai (Sonan, 1937)
- Anterhynchium indosinense Gusenleitner, 1998
- Anterhynchium madecassum (de Saussure, 1852)
- Anterhynchium melanopterum Sk. Yamane, 1981
- Anterhynchium mellyi (de Saussure, 1853)
- Anterhynchium mephisto Gribodo, 1892
- Anterhynchium nigrocinctum (de Saussure, 1853)
- Anterhynchium nimbosum Giordani Soika, 1987
- Anterhynchium osborni (Bequaert, 1918)
- Anterhynchium pacificum (Kirsch, 1878)
- Anterhynchium pensum Giordani Soika, 1937
- Anterhynchium rufipes (Fabricius, 1775)
- Anterhynchium sulphureomaculatum Schulthess, 1928
- Anterhynchium synagroide (de Saussure, 1852)
- Anterhynchium tamarinum (de Saussure, 1853)
- Anterhynchium tasmaniense (de Saussure, 1853)
- Anterhynchium townesi van der Vecht, 1963
- Anterhynchium vastator Giordani Soika, 1983
- Anterhynchium woodfordi Meade-Waldo, 1910
- Anterhynchium yunnanense Giordani Soika, 1973

Elsewhere, under Anterhynchium synagroides

- Odynerus synagroides var. alpha Schulthess, 1924 (see Anterhynchium alpha)
- Odynerus synagroides var. beta Schulthess, 1924(see Anterhynchium beta)
