= Aethiopicodynerus =

Scientific classification
- Domain: Eukaryota
- Kingdom: Animalia
- Phylum: Arthropoda
- Class: Insecta
- Order: Hymenoptera
- Family: Vespidae
- Subfamily: Eumeninae
- Genus: Aethiopicodynerus; Giordani Soika, 1965

Species
- Aethiopicodynerus bimammilatus (Gusenleitner, 1987); Aethiopicodynerus capensis (de Saussure, 1856); Aethiopicodynerus flavorufus (Giordani Soika, 1941); Aethiopicodynerus guichardi (Giordani Soika, 1979); Aethiopicodynerus insignis (de Saussure, 1856); Aethiopicodynerus laetus (Giordani Soika, 1941); Aethiopicodynerus major (de Saussure, 1853); Aethiopicodynerus mimulus (Giordani Soika, 1989); Aethiopicodynerus punctiventris (Gusenleitner, 2002); Aethiopicodynerus schulthessi (Meade-Waldo, 1915); Aethiopicodynerus scripticeps (Cameron, 1910); Aethiopicodynerus senegalensis (Giordani Soika, 1987)

Genus of wasps

Aethiopicodynerus is an Afrotropical genus of potter wasps.
