= Allepipona perspicax =

Scientific classification
- Domain: Eukaryota
- Kingdom: Animalia
- Phylum: Arthropoda
- Class: Insecta
- Order: Hymenoptera
- Family: Vespidae
- Subfamily: Eumeninae
- Genus: Allepipona
- Species: A. perspicax

Binomial name
- Allepipona perspicax Giordani Soika, 1987

Species of wasp

Allepipona perspicax is a species of wasp in the Vespidae family. It was described by Giordani Soika in 1987.
