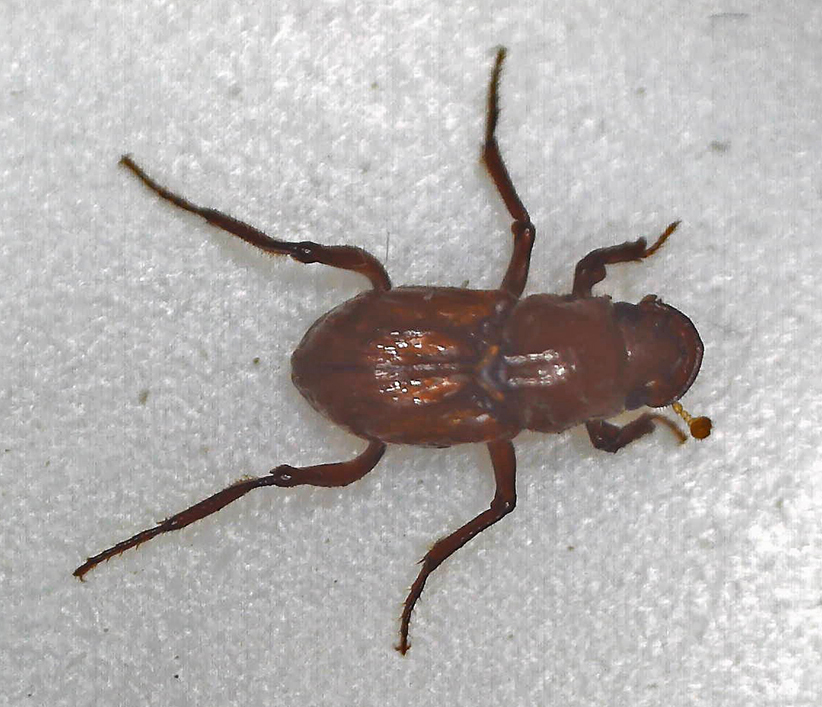
- Paracorythoderus marshalli, Botswana

Scientific classification
- Kingdom: Animalia
- Phylum: Arthropoda
- Clade: Pancrustacea
- Class: Insecta
- Order: Coleoptera
- Suborder: Polyphaga
- Infraorder: Scarabaeiformia
- Family: Scarabaeidae
- Subfamily: Aphodiinae
- Tribe: Corythoderini; Schmidt, 1910

= Corythoderini =

Tribe of beetles

Corythoderini is a tribe of scarab beetles in the family Scarabaeidae. There are about 6 genera and more than 30 described species in Corythoderini.

== Genera ==
These six genera belong to the tribe Corythoderini:

- Chaetopisthes Westwood, 1847
- Corythoderus Klug, 1845
- Eocorythoderus Marumaya, 2012
- Hemicorythoderus Tangelder & Krikken, 1982
- Paracorythoderus Wasmann, 1918
- Termitopisthes Wasmann, 1918
