= Afroxanthodynerus baidoensis =

Scientific classification
- Kingdom: Animalia
- Phylum: Arthropoda
- Clade: Pancrustacea
- Class: Insecta
- Order: Hymenoptera
- Family: Vespidae
- Genus: Afroxanthodynerus
- Species: A. baidoensis

Binomial name
- Afroxanthodynerus baidoensis Giordani Soika, 1989

Species of wasp

Afroxanthodynerus baidoensis is a species of wasp that belongs to the family Vespidae. It was described by Giordani Soika, an Italian entomologist and ecologist, in 1989.
