= Corythoderus braminus =

Scientific classification
- Kingdom: Animalia
- Phylum: Arthropoda
- Clade: Pancrustacea
- Class: Insecta
- Order: Coleoptera
- Suborder: Polyphaga
- Infraorder: Scarabaeiformia
- Family: Scarabaeidae
- Genus: Corythoderus
- Species: C. braminus

Binomial name
- Corythoderus braminus (Wasmann, 1918)

Synonyms
- Corythoderus (Stenocorythoderus) braminus; Stenocorythoderus braminus Wasmann, 1918

Species of beetle

Corythoderus braminus is a species of beetle of the family Scarabaeidae. It is found in India (Gujarat).

== Description ==
Adults reach a length of about 2.6 mm (0.10 in). They have a shiny, almost hairless, finely and sparsely punctate, dark rust-red body.

== Life history ==
Specimens have been found in the nests of Odontotermes obesus.
