= Termitopisthes forticulus =

Scientific classification
- Kingdom: Animalia
- Phylum: Arthropoda
- Clade: Pancrustacea
- Class: Insecta
- Order: Coleoptera
- Suborder: Polyphaga
- Infraorder: Scarabaeiformia
- Family: Scarabaeidae
- Genus: Termitopisthes
- Species: T. forticulus

Binomial name
- Termitopisthes forticulus Tangelder & Krikken, 1982

Species of beetle

Termitopisthes forticulus is a species of beetle of the family Scarabaeidae. It is found in India (Uttarakhand).

== Description ==
Adults reach a length of about 3.6–3.8 mm (0.14–0.15 in) for males and 3.4–4.1 mm (0.13–0.16 in) for females. They have a shiny, yellow-brown to brown body, with light brown-yellow pilosity.

== Life history ==
Specimens have been found in the nests of Odontotermes obesus.
