= Acarodynerus exarmatus =

Scientific classification
- Kingdom: Animalia
- Phylum: Arthropoda
- Clade: Pancrustacea
- Class: Insecta
- Order: Hymenoptera
- Family: Vespidae
- Genus: Acarodynerus
- Species: A. exarmatus

Binomial name
- Acarodynerus exarmatus (Giordani Soika, 1937)

Synonyms
- Odynerus (Stenodynerus) exarmatus Giordani Soika, 1937

Species of wasp

Acarodynerus exarmatus is a species of wasp in the family Vespidae. It is endemic to Western Australia.
