= Termitopisthes wasmanni =

Scientific classification
- Kingdom: Animalia
- Phylum: Arthropoda
- Clade: Pancrustacea
- Class: Insecta
- Order: Coleoptera
- Suborder: Polyphaga
- Infraorder: Scarabaeiformia
- Family: Scarabaeidae
- Genus: Termitopisthes
- Species: T. wasmanni

Binomial name
- Termitopisthes wasmanni (Schmidt, 1910)

Synonyms
- Chaetopisthes wasmanni Schmidt, 1910; Termitopisthes laticollis Wasmann, 1918; Termitopisthes nobilis Wasmann, 1918

Species of beetle

Termitopisthes wasmanni is a species of beetle of the family Scarabaeidae. It is found in Bangladesh, India (Jharkhand, Karnataka, Madhya Pradesh) and Myanmar.

== Description ==
Adults reach a length of about 2.7–3.1 mm (0.11–0.12 in) for males and 2.9–3.3 mm (0.11–0.13 in) for females. They have a shiny, light to dark rust-red to reddish-yellow body, covered with fairly dense, whitish, erect hairs.

== Life history ==
Specimens have been found in the nests of Odontotermes obesus and Odontotermes bangalorensis.
