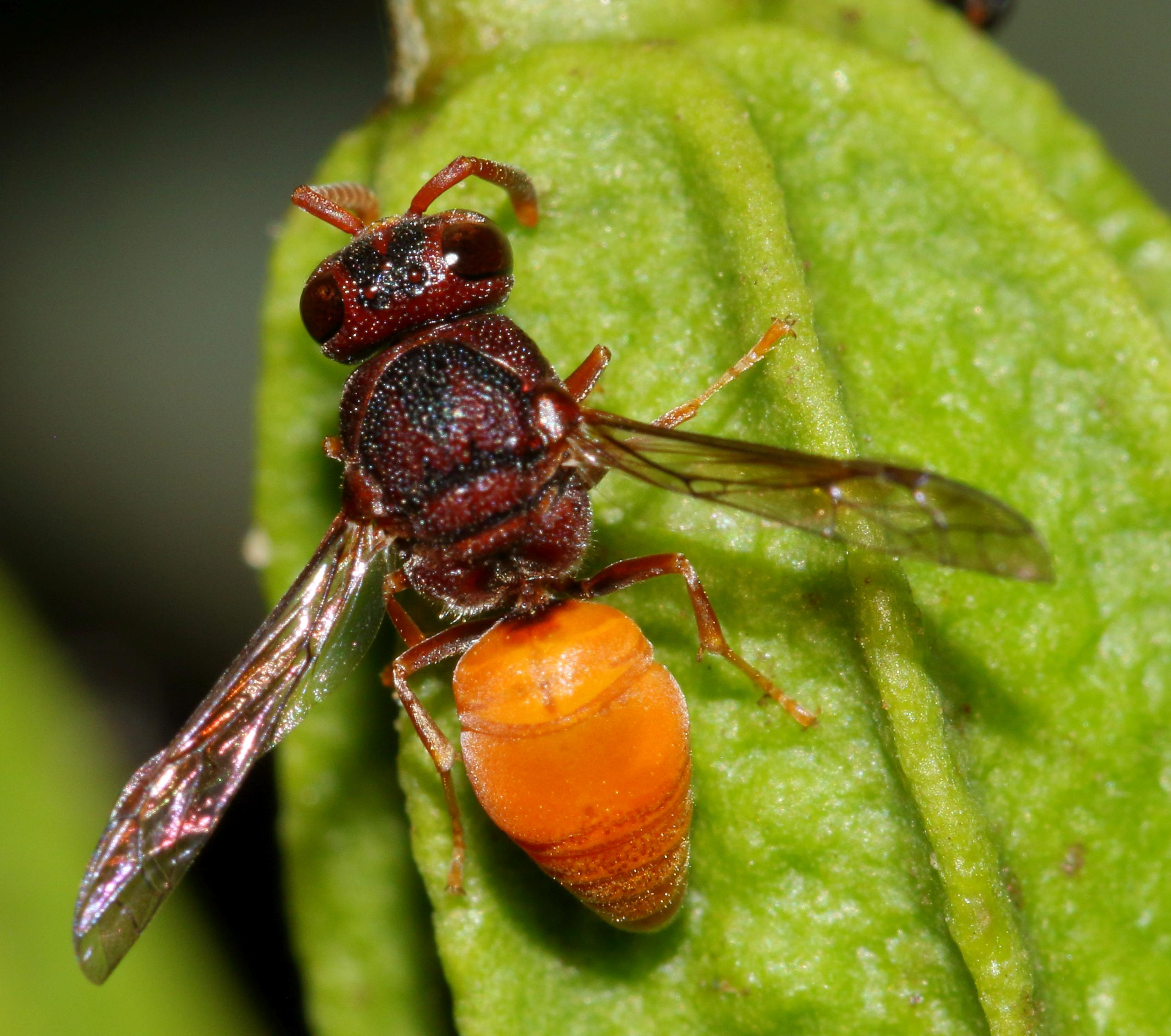
- Proepipona sp., South Africa

Scientific classification
- Domain: Eukaryota
- Kingdom: Animalia
- Phylum: Arthropoda
- Class: Insecta
- Order: Hymenoptera
- Family: Vespidae
- Subfamily: Eumeninae
- Genus: Proepipona; Giordani Soika, 1977

Type species
- Proepipona lateralis (Fabricius, 1781)

Species
- Proepipona ampla; Proepipona bothriogaster; Proepipona falcata; Proepipona lateralis; Proepipona marginipunctata; Proepipona meadewaldoi; Proepipona rhodesiensis

= Proepipona =

Genus of wasps

Proepipona is an Afrotropical genus of potter wasps.

== Species, subspecies and distribution ==
Seven species have been described.

- Proepipona ampla ampla Giordani Soika, 1989
  - Distribution: Cameroon, Liberia.
- Proepipona ampla ealensis Giordani Soika, 1989
  - Distribution: Democratic Republic of Congo.

- Proepipona bothriogaster (Schletterer, 1891)
  - Distribution: Democratic Republic of Congo.

- Proepipona falcata (Tullgren, 1904)
  - Distribution: Cameroon, Democratic Republic of Congo, Equatorial Guinea, Gabon, Ivory Coast, Kenya, Nigeria, Tanzania.

- Proepipona lateralis lateralis (Fabricius, 1781)
  - Distribution: Burkina Faso, Cameroon, Cape Verde (Santiago), Central African Republic, Democratic Republic of Congo, Ethiopia, Gabon, Mali, Niger, Nigeria, Senegal, Sierra Leone, South Africa, Sudan, Tanzania.
- Proepipona lateralis lateropicta (Bequaert, 1918)
  - Distribution: Democratic Republic of Congo, Mozambique, Namibia.
- Proepipona lateralis marginiscutis (Cameron, 1910)
  - Distribution: Botswana, Burundi, Democratic Republic of Congo, Namibia, South Africa, Tanzania, Zambia.
- Proepipona lateralis paolii (Giordani Soika, 1934)
  - Distribution: Somalia.

- Proepipona marginipunctata (Meade-Waldo, 1915)
  - Distribution: Malawi, Zambia.

- Proepipona meadewaldoi meadewaldoi (Bequaert, 1918)
  - Distribution: Malawi, Mozambique, Namibia, South Africa, Zambia, Zimbabwe.
- Proepipona meadewaldoi postscutellaris Giordani Soika, 1989
  - Distribution: Angola.
- Proepipona meadewaldoi sedata (Giordani Soika, 1940)
  - Distribution: Kenya, Somalia, South Africa.

- Proepipona rhodesiensis rhodesiensis (Giordani Soika, 1941)
  - Distribution: Zambia, Zimbabwe.
- Proepipona rhodesiensis aurea Giordani Soika, 1983
  - Distribution: Democratic Republic of Congo.
- Proepipona rhodesiensis flavofasciata Giordani Soika, 1983
  - Distribution: Democratic Republic of Congo.
- Proepipona rhodesiensis ruficollis Giordani Soika, 1989
  - Distribution: South Africa.
