= Allepipona schultzeana =

Scientific classification
- Domain: Eukaryota
- Kingdom: Animalia
- Phylum: Arthropoda
- Class: Insecta
- Order: Hymenoptera
- Family: Vespidae
- Subfamily: Eumeninae
- Genus: Allepipona
- Species: A. schultzeana

Binomial name
- Allepipona schultzeana (von Schulthess, 1914)

Species of wasp

Allepipona schultzeana is a species of wasp in the family Vespidae. It was described by Anton von Schulthess-Rechberg in 1914.
