= Leptochilus =

The genus Leptochilus in biological nomenclature can refer to either:

- Leptochilus (plant), a fern genus in the polypody family (Polypodiaceae)
- Leptochilus (wasp), an insect genus in the wasp family (Vespidae)
