= Chaetopisthes brevipes =

Scientific classification
- Kingdom: Animalia
- Phylum: Arthropoda
- Clade: Pancrustacea
- Class: Insecta
- Order: Coleoptera
- Suborder: Polyphaga
- Infraorder: Scarabaeiformia
- Family: Scarabaeidae
- Genus: Chaetopisthes
- Species: C. brevipes

Binomial name
- Chaetopisthes brevipes Champion & Wasmann, 1923

Species of beetle

Chaetopisthes brevipes is a species of beetle of the family Scarabaeidae. It is found in India (Jharkhand, Uttarakhand).

== Description ==
Adults reach a length of about 3.2 mm (0.13 in). They are similar to Chaetopisthes heimi in both shape and coloration, but the upper surface is less glossy.
