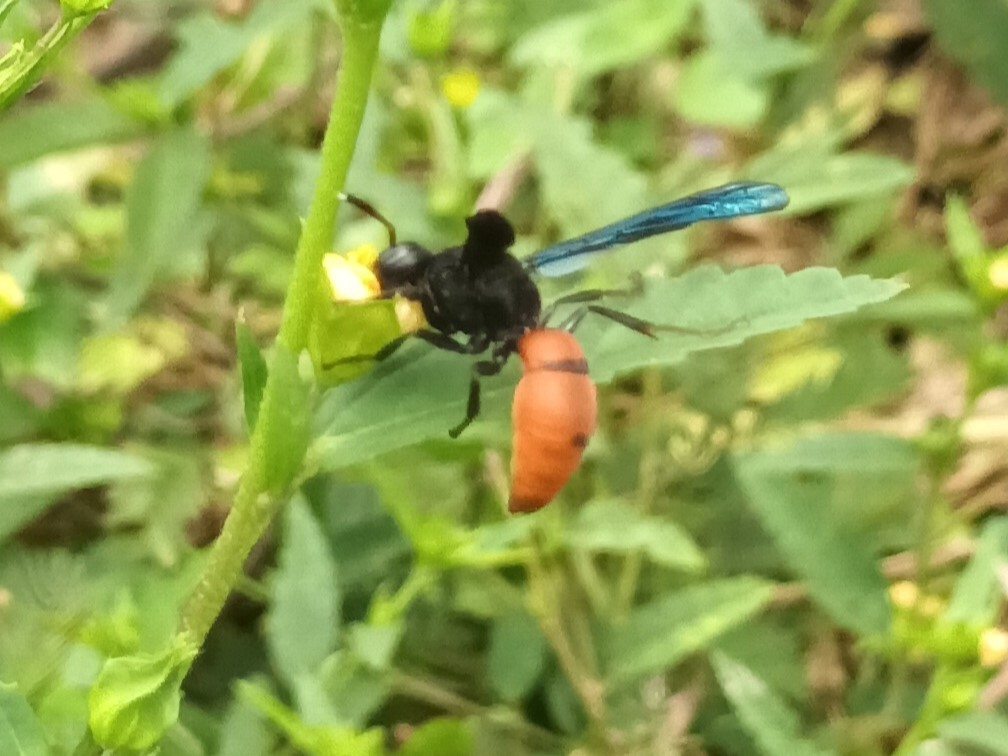

Scientific classification
- Domain: Eukaryota
- Kingdom: Animalia
- Phylum: Arthropoda
- Class: Insecta
- Order: Hymenoptera
- Family: Vespidae
- Genus: Anterhynchium
- Species: A. abdominale

Binomial name
- Anterhynchium abdominale (Illiger, 1802)

= Anterhynchium abdominale =

Species of insect

Anterhynchium abdominale is a species of potter wasp in the family Vespidae. It is native to India, Pakistan and Sri Lanka.

== Taxonomy ==
This wasp was first described in 1802 by the German entomologist and zoologist Johann Karl Wilhelm Illiger. There are two subspecies, A. a. abdominale and A. a. bengalensis. There are considerable differences in the colour patterns of the abdominal tergites of these subspecies, and further study is needed to determine their correct status as subspecies or full species. The potter wasps used to be considered a separate family, Eumenidae, but it is now considered to be a subfamily, Eumeninae, of the family Vespidae, the wasps.

== Ecology ==
Like most other potter wasps, Anterhynchium abdominale is a solitary species. The female excavates a nesting hole or uses a pre-existing cavity in which to nest. A single egg is laid in the nest, which is then provisioned by the female who forages for caterpillars and other insects, stinging them to paralyse them. The nest is then sealed, and the developing wasp larva feeds on the supplies, which are kept fresh by being alive. In one instance in Punjab, an old termite mound of Odontotermes obesus was used for nesting, with several individual wasp cells scattered across the surface. Egg-laying took place in January and the larvae pupated in June, emerging as adults in July and August.
