= Chaetopisthes assmuthi =

Scientific classification
- Kingdom: Animalia
- Phylum: Arthropoda
- Clade: Pancrustacea
- Class: Insecta
- Order: Coleoptera
- Suborder: Polyphaga
- Infraorder: Scarabaeiformia
- Family: Scarabaeidae
- Genus: Chaetopisthes
- Species: C. assmuthi

Binomial name
- Chaetopisthes assmuthi Wasmann, 1903

Species of beetle

Chaetopisthes assmuthi is a species of beetle of the family Scarabaeidae. It is found in India (Maharashtra).

== Description ==
Adults reach a length of about 2.9–3.4 mm (0.11–0.13 in) for males and 3.2–3.8 mm (0.13–0.15 in) for females. They have a not very shiny, light reddish-yellow body, with short, sparse, whitish hairs.

== Life history ==
Specimens have been found in the nests of Odontotermes obesus.
