= Acarodynerus =

Scientific classification
- Kingdom: Animalia
- Phylum: Arthropoda
- Clade: Pancrustacea
- Class: Insecta
- Order: Hymenoptera
- Family: Vespidae
- Subfamily: Eumeninae
- Genus: Acarodynerus; Soika, 1962

Species
- See text

Genus of wasps

Acarodynerus is an Australasian genus of potter wasps. It is native to Australia.

The genus was named by Antonio Giordani Soika in 1962.

== Species ==
- Acarodynerus acarophilus
- Acarodynerus atrorufus
- Acarodynerus batchelorensis
- Acarodynerus clypeatus
- Acarodynerus denticulatus
- Acarodynerus dietrichianus
- Acarodynerus drewsenianus
- Acarodynerus exarmatus
- Acarodynerus legatus
- Acarodynerus lunaris
- Acarodynerus paleovariatus
- Acarodynerus posttegulatus
- Acarodynerus propodalaris
- Acarodynerus propodealaris
- Acarodynerus quadrangolum
- Acarodynerus queenslandicus
- Acarodynerus rectangolum
- Acarodynerus spargovillensis
- Acarodynerus spectrum
- Acarodynerus triangulum
