= Termitopisthes termiticola =

Scientific classification
- Kingdom: Animalia
- Phylum: Arthropoda
- Clade: Pancrustacea
- Class: Insecta
- Order: Coleoptera
- Suborder: Polyphaga
- Infraorder: Scarabaeiformia
- Family: Scarabaeidae
- Genus: Termitopisthes
- Species: T. termiticola

Binomial name
- Termitopisthes termiticola (Gestro, 1891)

Synonyms
- Chaetopisthes termiticola Gestro, 1891

Species of beetle

Termitopisthes termiticola is a species of beetle of the family Scarabaeidae. It is found in Myanmar.

== Description ==
Adults reach a length of about 3.3 mm (0.13 in). They have a yellowish-brown body, with fairly dense, short hair.

== Life history ==
The single known specimen of this species was found in the nest of an unknown termite species.
