= Termitopisthes kistneri =

Scientific classification
- Kingdom: Animalia
- Phylum: Arthropoda
- Clade: Pancrustacea
- Class: Insecta
- Order: Coleoptera
- Suborder: Polyphaga
- Infraorder: Scarabaeiformia
- Family: Scarabaeidae
- Genus: Termitopisthes
- Species: T. kistneri

Binomial name
- Termitopisthes kistneri Tangelder & Krikken, 1982

Species of beetle

Termitopisthes kistneri is a species of beetle of the family Scarabaeidae. It is found in India (Uttarakhand).

== Description ==
Adults reach a length of about 2.6–2.9 mm (0.10–0.11 in) for males and 3–3.2 mm (0.12–0.13 in) for females. They have a shiny, red-brown body, with pale yellow pilosity.

== Etymology ==
The species is named in honour of Professor David H. Kistner, an expert on myrmecophilous and termitophilous Staphylinidae.
