= Chaetopisthes ventriosus =

Scientific classification
- Kingdom: Animalia
- Phylum: Arthropoda
- Clade: Pancrustacea
- Class: Insecta
- Order: Coleoptera
- Suborder: Polyphaga
- Infraorder: Scarabaeiformia
- Family: Scarabaeidae
- Genus: Chaetopisthes
- Species: C. ventriosus

Binomial name
- Chaetopisthes ventriosus Tangelder & Krikken, 1982

Species of beetle

Chaetopisthes ventriosus is a species of beetle of the family Scarabaeidae. It is found in India (Bihar).

== Description ==
Adults reach a length of about 3.4 mm (0.13 in). They have a feebly shiny, light brown body, with pale yellow pilosity.
