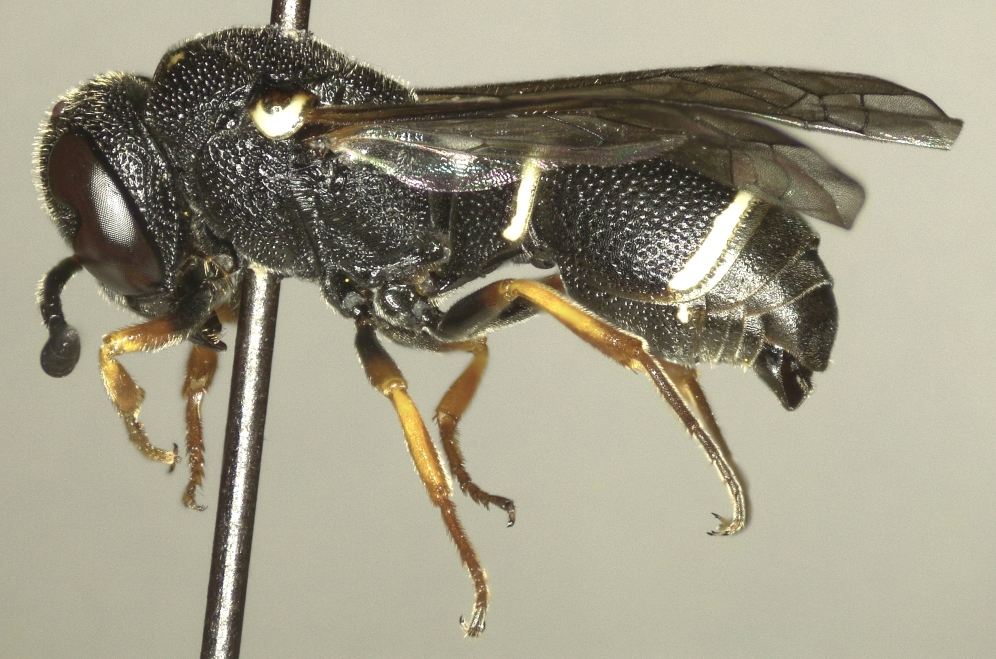

Scientific classification
- Domain: Eukaryota
- Kingdom: Animalia
- Phylum: Arthropoda
- Class: Insecta
- Order: Hymenoptera
- Family: Vespidae
- Subfamily: Eumeninae
- Genus: Leptochilus
- Species: L. quintus

Binomial name
- Leptochilus quintus Gusenleitner, 1991

= Leptochilus quintus =

Species of insect

Leptochilus quintus is a species of potter wasp, described in 1991, based on a single (holotype) specimen identified from the Natural History Museum in Budapest. The specimen was collected in 1885 in Podvežica, a part of the nowadays Rijeka in Croatia. Since only one specimen was ever collected, the species was considered extinct.

== Males ==
Unexpectedly, six males of this species were collected on the mountain of Mosor near Split in May and June 2021, thus re-discovering the species that was considered to have been extinct for 136 years, since no specimens were collected during that entire period. These specimens were collected in a very narrow mountain path, in an area severely affected by the firestorm in 2017. The genetic analysis of two of these specimens suggested that they were different in two base pairs of the COI gene, suggesting that the population must have retained some diversity and might not be severely threatened. Two more males were collected and released in early June, but without collecting the female, which remained undescribed. Interestingly, only one of the males resembled the holotype, by having an entirely black clypeus; all others, including the two released specimens, had yellow markings on the clypeus. This is one of the smallest European vespid wasps, with up to 6 mm of body length.

== Females ==
Two females of the same species were collected in the same location a year after, enabling the description of the female. Additional specimens were collected in one more location in Mosor mountain, and also in Kozjak and Dinara mountains. Notably, the specimens were collected in only five locations along nearly 130 km of carefully examined mountain paths, suggesting a fragmented and very patchy occurrence. At this moment, the species is considered endemic to Croatia. Several taxonomic issues in this genus in Southern and Eastern Europe are still unresolved, including the relationship of L. quintus with L. crassipunctatus (Maidl), requiring further taxonomic work and genetic comparison.

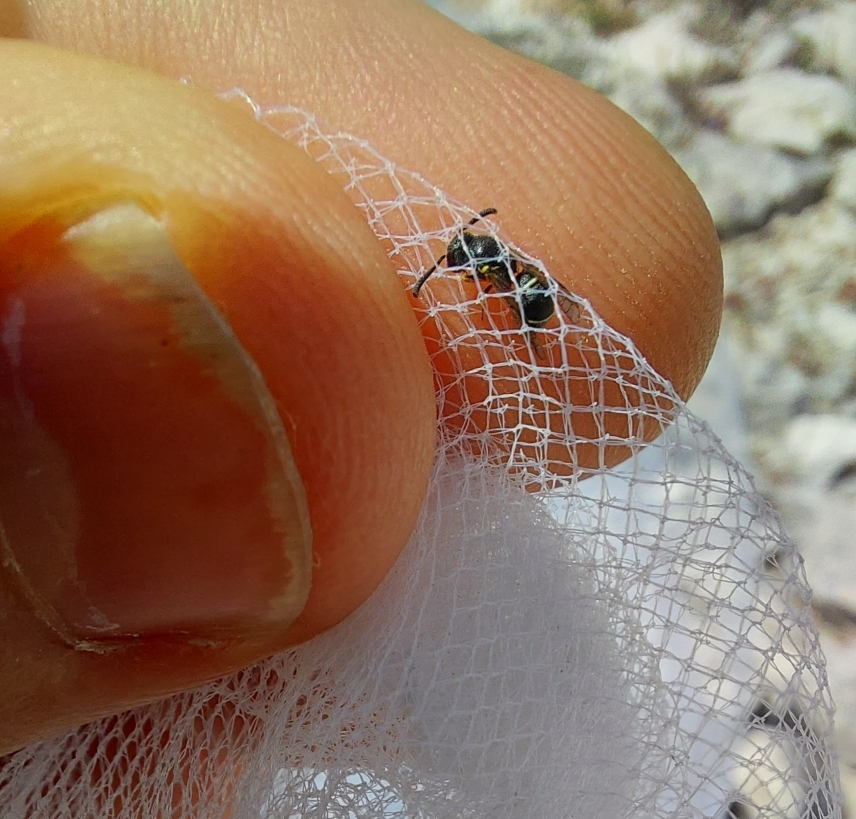
A male specimen that was collected and released in June 2021
