= Chaetopisthes fulvus =

Scientific classification
- Kingdom: Animalia
- Phylum: Arthropoda
- Clade: Pancrustacea
- Class: Insecta
- Order: Coleoptera
- Suborder: Polyphaga
- Infraorder: Scarabaeiformia
- Family: Scarabaeidae
- Genus: Chaetopisthes
- Species: C. fulvus

Binomial name
- Chaetopisthes fulvus Westwood, 1847

Synonyms
- Chaetopisthes arrowi Balthasar, 1941

Species of beetle

Chaetopisthes fulvus is a species of beetle of the family Scarabaeidae. It is found in India (Madhya Pradesh) and Bangladesh.

== Description ==
Adults reach a length of about 3.5–4 mm (0.14–0.16 in). They have an elongate, highly lustrous, light rust-red body, with the head and pronotum somewhat darker.
