= Paracorythoderus endroedyi =

Scientific classification
- Kingdom: Animalia
- Phylum: Arthropoda
- Clade: Pancrustacea
- Class: Insecta
- Order: Coleoptera
- Suborder: Polyphaga
- Infraorder: Scarabaeiformia
- Family: Scarabaeidae
- Genus: Paracorythoderus
- Species: P. endroedyi

Binomial name
- Paracorythoderus endroedyi Endrödi, 1991

Species of beetle

Paracorythoderus endroedyi is a species of beetle of the family Scarabaeidae. It is found in Namibia.

== Description ==
Adults reach a length of about 3 mm (0.12 in). They have a shiny, reddish-brown body, with the elytra darker. The surface (except for the head) is shiny and smooth. The head, pronotum and elytra have a pattern of elevations, with fine, semi-erect hairs.
