= Aethiopicodynerus mimulus =

Scientific classification
- Domain: Eukaryota
- Kingdom: Animalia
- Phylum: Arthropoda
- Class: Insecta
- Order: Hymenoptera
- Family: Vespidae
- Genus: Aethiopicodynerus
- Species: A. mimulus

Binomial name
- Aethiopicodynerus mimulus (Giordani Soika, 1989)

Species of wasp

Aethiopicodynerus mimulus is a species of wasp in the family Vespidae. It was described by Giordani Soika in 1989.
