= Termitopisthes submissus =

Scientific classification
- Kingdom: Animalia
- Phylum: Arthropoda
- Clade: Pancrustacea
- Class: Insecta
- Order: Coleoptera
- Suborder: Polyphaga
- Infraorder: Scarabaeiformia
- Family: Scarabaeidae
- Genus: Termitopisthes
- Species: T. submissus

Binomial name
- Termitopisthes submissus Tangelder & Krikken, 1982

Species of beetle

Termitopisthes submissus is a species of beetle of the family Scarabaeidae. It is found in India (Uttarakhand).

== Description ==
Adults reach a length of about 3.4–3.6 mm (0.13–0.14 in). They have a shiny, light red-brown body, with pale yellow pilosity.
