= Chaetopisthes longulus =

Scientific classification
- Kingdom: Animalia
- Phylum: Arthropoda
- Clade: Pancrustacea
- Class: Insecta
- Order: Coleoptera
- Suborder: Polyphaga
- Infraorder: Scarabaeiformia
- Family: Scarabaeidae
- Genus: Chaetopisthes
- Species: C. longulus

Binomial name
- Chaetopisthes longulus Champion & Wasmann, 1923

Species of beetle

Chaetopisthes longulus is a species of beetle of the family Scarabaeidae. It is found in India (Uttarakhand).

== Description ==
Adults reach a length of about 3.3 mm (0.13 in) for males and 3.7 mm (0.15 in) for females. They have a slender, light rust-red body, with the stripes on the elytra somewhat darkened.
