= Chaetopisthes popei =

Scientific classification
- Kingdom: Animalia
- Phylum: Arthropoda
- Clade: Pancrustacea
- Class: Insecta
- Order: Coleoptera
- Suborder: Polyphaga
- Infraorder: Scarabaeiformia
- Family: Scarabaeidae
- Genus: Chaetopisthes
- Species: C. popei

Binomial name
- Chaetopisthes popei Tangelder & Krikken, 1982

Species of beetle

Chaetopisthes popei is a species of beetle of the family Scarabaeidae. It is found in India (Tamil Nadu).

== Description ==
Adults reach a length of about 3.9–4.2 mm (0.15–0.17 in). They have a shiny, red-brown body, with pale-yellow pilosity.

== Etymology ==
The species is named in honour of Coleopterist BM, R. D. Pope.
