= Eocorythoderus =

Scientific classification
- Kingdom: Animalia
- Phylum: Arthropoda
- Clade: Pancrustacea
- Class: Insecta
- Order: Coleoptera
- Suborder: Polyphaga
- Infraorder: Scarabaeiformia
- Family: Scarabaeidae
- Subfamily: Aphodiinae
- Tribe: Corythoderini
- Genus: Eocorythoderus; Marumaya, 2012
- Species: E. incredibilis

Binomial name
- Eocorythoderus incredibilis Marumaya, 2012

Genus of beetles

Eocorythoderus is a genus of beetle of the family Scarabaeidae. It is monotypic, being represented by the single species, Eocorythoderus incredibilis, which is found in north-western Cambodia.

== Description ==
Adults reach a length of about 2.81–2.96 mm (0.111–0.117 in). They have a short, panduriform body.

== Etymology ==
The species name means incredible and refers to its extraordinary appearance and unexpected discovery.
