= Allepipona emortualis =

Scientific classification
- Domain: Eukaryota
- Kingdom: Animalia
- Phylum: Arthropoda
- Class: Insecta
- Order: Hymenoptera
- Family: Vespidae
- Genus: Allepipona
- Species: A. emortualis

Binomial name
- Allepipona emortualis (Saussure, 1853)

Species of wasp

Allepipona emortualis is a species of wasp in the Vespidae family. It was described by Saussure in 1853.
