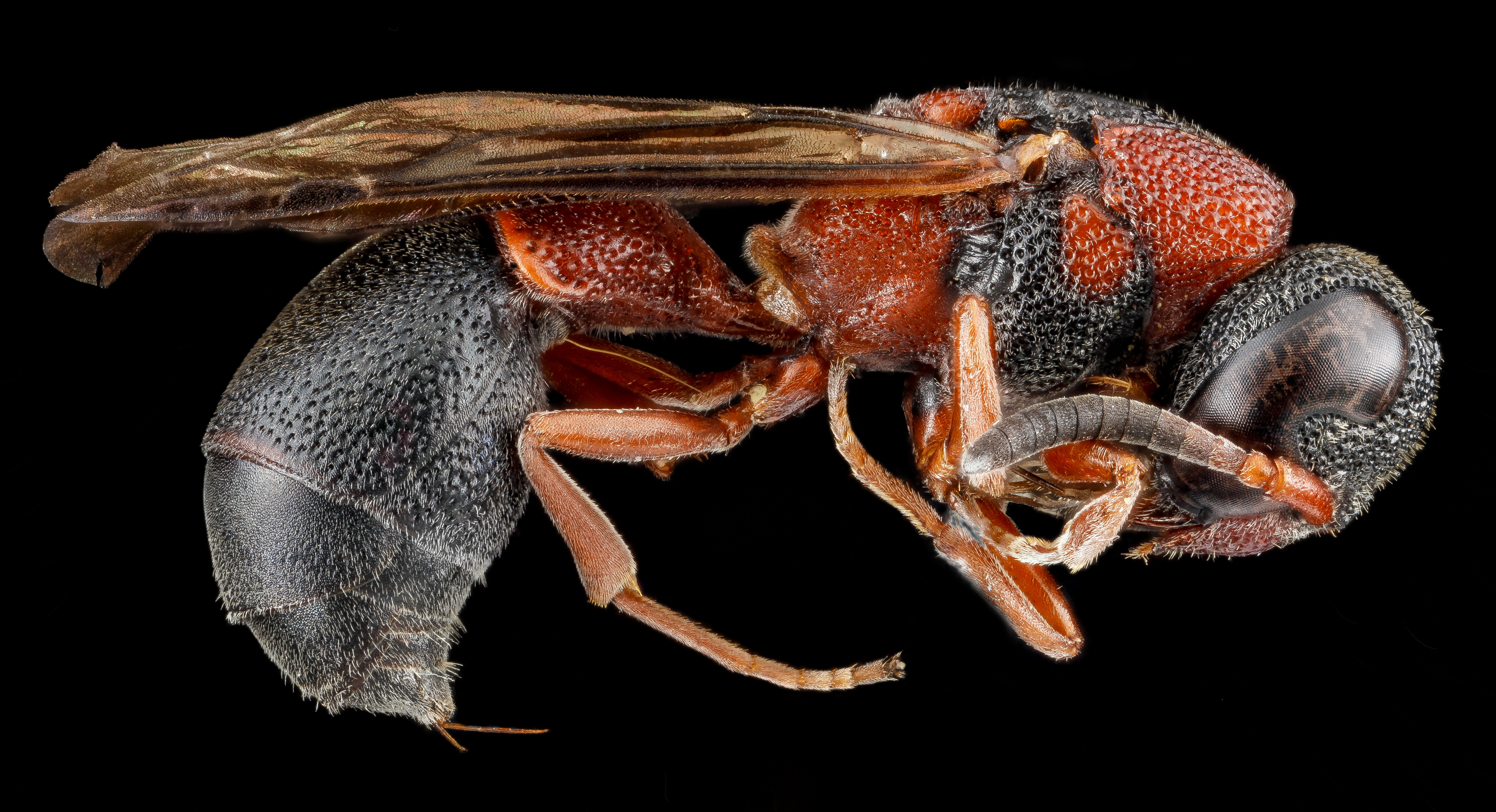
- Leptochilus acolhuus (Saussure)

Scientific classification
- Domain: Eukaryota
- Kingdom: Animalia
- Phylum: Arthropoda
- Class: Insecta
- Order: Hymenoptera
- Family: Vespidae
- Subfamily: Eumeninae
- Genus: Leptochilus; Saussure, 1853

Type species
- Pterochilus mauritanicus Lepeletier, 1841

Subgenera
- Euleptochilus; Leptochilus; Lionotulus; Neoleptochilus; Sarochilus; Zandallia

Diversity
- at least 210 species

= Leptochilus (wasp) =

Genus of wasps

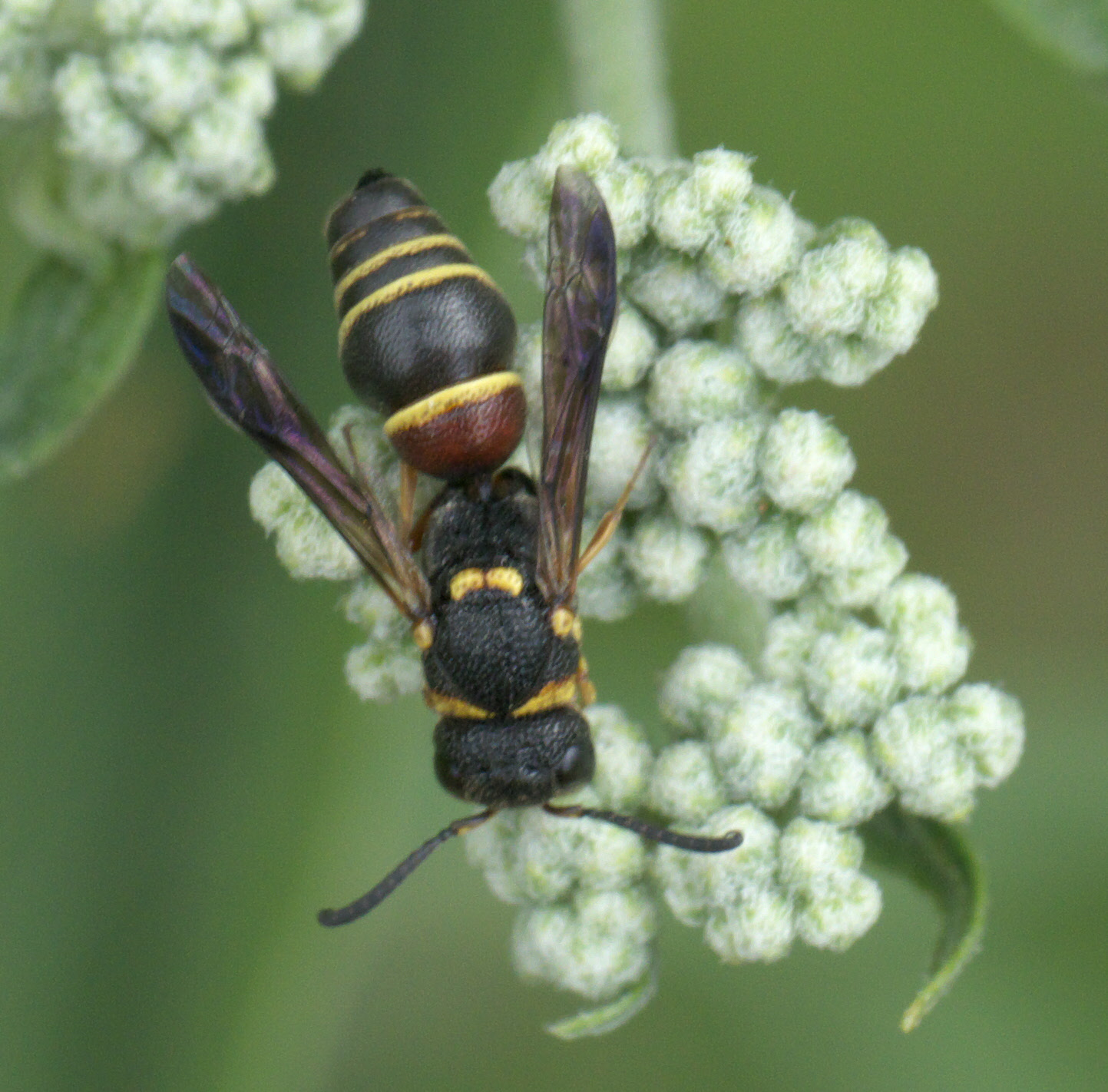
Leptochilus republicanus

Leptochilus is a large, mostly Holarctic genus of small sized potter wasps. The genus reaches its largest diversity in the Palearctic where there are more than 135 species belonging to 5 subgenera. However the division of The division of Leptochilus into subgenera can not be fully supported and the status of some of them is dubious.

== Species ==
The following list sets out some of the species included in Leptichilus:

=== Subgenus Euleptochilus ===
- Leptochilus camurus (Giordani Soika, 1938)
- Leptochilus cruentatus (Brullé, 1840)
- Leptochilus duplicatus (Klug, 1835)
- Leptochilus fortunatus Blüthgen, 1958
- Leptochilus limbiferus (Moravitz, 1867)
- Leptochilus rubellulus (Kohl, 1907)
- Leptochilus somalicus Giordani Soika, 1987

=== Leptochilus ===
- Leptochilus mauritanicus (Lepeletier, 1841)

=== Subgenus Lionutus ===
- Leptochilus aterrimus (Kirby, 1900)

=== Subgenus Neoleptochilus ===
- Leptochilus medanae (Gribodo, 1886)
- Leptochilus tuareg Gusenleitner, 2006

=== Subgenus Sarochilus ===
- Leptochilus alterego Gusenleitner, 1970
- Leptochilus brussiloffi (Dusmet 1917)
- Leptochilus gayuboi Sanza 2003
- Leptochilus ibizanus (Schulthess, 1934)
- Leptochilus leopoldoi Sanza, 2003

=== Subgenus Zendallia ===
- Leptochilus acolhuus (Saussure, 1857)
- Leptochilus zendalus (Saussure, 1870)

== See also ==
- List of Leptochilus species
