= Chaetopisthes fulvoides =

Scientific classification
- Kingdom: Animalia
- Phylum: Arthropoda
- Clade: Pancrustacea
- Class: Insecta
- Order: Coleoptera
- Suborder: Polyphaga
- Infraorder: Scarabaeiformia
- Family: Scarabaeidae
- Genus: Chaetopisthes
- Species: C. fulvoides

Binomial name
- Chaetopisthes fulvoides Tangelder & Krikken, 1982

Species of beetle

Chaetopisthes fulvoides is a species of beetle of the family Scarabaeidae. It is found in India (Jharkhand).

== Description ==
Adults reach a length of about 3.3–3.6 mm (0.13–0.14 in) for males and 3.6–4 mm (0.14–0.16 in) for females. They have a shiny, yellow-brown body, with pale yellow pilosity.
