= Corythoderus =

Scientific classification
- Kingdom: Animalia
- Phylum: Arthropoda
- Clade: Pancrustacea
- Class: Insecta
- Order: Coleoptera
- Suborder: Polyphaga
- Infraorder: Scarabaeiformia
- Family: Scarabaeidae
- Subfamily: Aphodiinae
- Tribe: Corythoderini
- Genus: Corythoderus; Klug, 1830

Genus of beetles

Corythoderus is a genus of beetles of the family Scarabaeidae.

== Species ==
- Subgenus Corythoderus
  - Corythoderus loripes Klug, 1830
- Subgenus Eurycorythoderus Wasmann, 1918
  - Corythoderus gibbiger Wasmann, 1899
- Subgenus Stenocorythoderus Wasmann, 1918
  - Corythoderus braminus (Wasmann, 1918)
