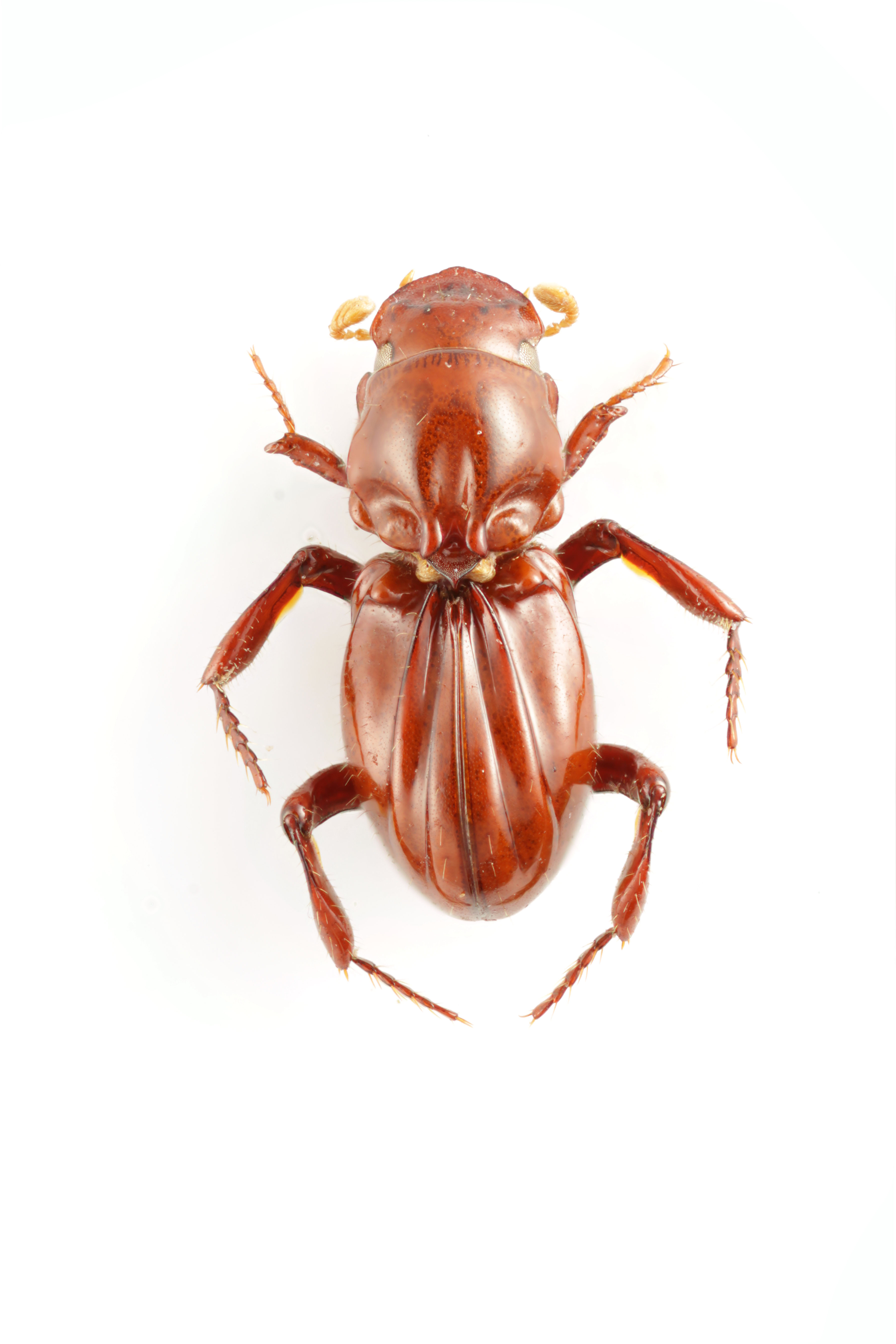

Scientific classification
- Kingdom: Animalia
- Phylum: Arthropoda
- Clade: Pancrustacea
- Class: Insecta
- Order: Coleoptera
- Suborder: Polyphaga
- Infraorder: Scarabaeiformia
- Family: Scarabaeidae
- Genus: Corythoderus
- Species: C. loripes

Binomial name
- Corythoderus loripes Klug, 1830

Synonyms
- Corythoderus (Corythoderus) loripes

= Corythoderus loripes =

Species of beetle

Corythoderus loripes is a species of beetle of the family Scarabaeidae. It is found in Chad, Ethiopia, Nigeria, Senegal and Sudan.

== Description ==
Adults reach a length of about 2.5–3.1 mm (0.098–0.122 in). They have a light brown to dark red-brown body.

== Life history ==
They are thought to be associated with Odontotermes species.
