= Acarodynerus dietrichianus =

Scientific classification
- Domain: Eukaryota
- Kingdom: Animalia
- Phylum: Arthropoda
- Class: Insecta
- Order: Hymenoptera
- Family: Vespidae
- Genus: Acarodynerus
- Species: A. dietrichianus

Binomial name
- Acarodynerus dietrichianus Giordani Soika, 1962

Species of wasp

Acarodynerus dietrichianus is a species of wasp in the family Vespidae. It was described by Giordani Soika in 1962.
