= Termitopisthes schmidti =

Scientific classification
- Kingdom: Animalia
- Phylum: Arthropoda
- Clade: Pancrustacea
- Class: Insecta
- Order: Coleoptera
- Suborder: Polyphaga
- Infraorder: Scarabaeiformia
- Family: Scarabaeidae
- Genus: Termitopisthes
- Species: T. schmidti

Binomial name
- Termitopisthes schmidti Champion & Wasmann, 1923

Species of beetle

Termitopisthes schmidti is a species of beetle of the family Scarabaeidae. It is found in India (Uttarakhand).

== Description ==
Adults reach a length of about 2.7–3 mm (0.11–0.12 in) for males and 2.9–3 mm (0.11–0.12 in) for females. They have a narrow, highly convex, rust-red body, sparsely and finely covered with erect hairs.
