= Afroxanthodynerus nigeriensis =

Scientific classification
- Kingdom: Animalia
- Phylum: Arthropoda
- Clade: Pancrustacea
- Class: Insecta
- Order: Hymenoptera
- Family: Vespidae
- Genus: Afroxanthodynerus
- Species: A. nigeriensis

Binomial name
- Afroxanthodynerus nigeriensis Giordani Soika, 1979

Species of wasp

Afroxanthodynerus nigeriensis is a species of wasp that belongs to the family Vespidae.
