= Chaetopisthes simplicipes =

Scientific classification
- Kingdom: Animalia
- Phylum: Arthropoda
- Clade: Pancrustacea
- Class: Insecta
- Order: Coleoptera
- Suborder: Polyphaga
- Infraorder: Scarabaeiformia
- Family: Scarabaeidae
- Genus: Chaetopisthes
- Species: C. simplicipes

Binomial name
- Chaetopisthes simplicipes Gestro, 1891

Species of beetle

Chaetopisthes simplicipes is a species of beetle of the family Scarabaeidae. It is found in India (Bihar).

== Description ==
Adults reach a length of about 2.7–3.1 mm (0.11–0.12 in) for males and 2.9–3.4 mm (0.11–0.13 in) for females. They have an elongate, rather narrow, yellow-brown body, with a silky sheen. They are sparsely covered with fine, short, yellowish hairs.
