= Aethiopicodynerus schulthessi =

Scientific classification
- Domain: Eukaryota
- Kingdom: Animalia
- Phylum: Arthropoda
- Class: Insecta
- Order: Hymenoptera
- Family: Vespidae
- Genus: Aethiopicodynerus
- Species: A. schulthessi

Binomial name
- Aethiopicodynerus schulthessi (Meade-Waldo, 1915)

Species of wasp

Aethiopicodynerus schulthessi is a species of wasp in the family Vespidae. It was described by Meade-Waldo in 1915.
