= Acarodynerus lunaris =

Scientific classification
- Domain: Eukaryota
- Kingdom: Animalia
- Phylum: Arthropoda
- Class: Insecta
- Order: Hymenoptera
- Family: Vespidae
- Genus: Acarodynerus
- Species: A. lunaris

Binomial name
- Acarodynerus lunaris Giordani Soika, 1977

Species of wasp

Acarodynerus lunaris is a species of wasp in the family Vespidae. It was described by Giordani Soika in 1977.
