= Paracorythoderus casperi =

Scientific classification
- Kingdom: Animalia
- Phylum: Arthropoda
- Clade: Pancrustacea
- Class: Insecta
- Order: Coleoptera
- Suborder: Polyphaga
- Infraorder: Scarabaeiformia
- Family: Scarabaeidae
- Genus: Paracorythoderus
- Species: P. casperi

Binomial name
- Paracorythoderus casperi (Kolbe, 1909)

Synonyms
- Corythoderus casperi Kolbe, 1909

Species of beetle

Paracorythoderus casperi is a species of beetle of the family Scarabaeidae. It is found in Namibia.

== Description ==
Adults reach a length of about 2.9 mm (0.11 in). They have a light red-brown body.
