= Corythoderus gibbiger =

Scientific classification
- Kingdom: Animalia
- Phylum: Arthropoda
- Clade: Pancrustacea
- Class: Insecta
- Order: Coleoptera
- Suborder: Polyphaga
- Infraorder: Scarabaeiformia
- Family: Scarabaeidae
- Genus: Corythoderus
- Species: C. gibbiger

Binomial name
- Corythoderus gibbiger Wasmann, 1899

Synonyms
- Corythoderus (Eurycorythoderus) gibbiger; Eurycorythoderus assmuthi Wasmann, 1918; Eurycorythoderus fossiger Wasmann, 1918

Species of beetle

Corythoderus gibbiger is a species of beetle of the family Scarabaeidae. It is found in India (Maharashtra).

== Description ==
Adults reach a length of about 2.8–3.1 mm (0.11–0.12 in). They have a rather short, shiny rust-red body, covered with erect hairs.

== Life history ==
Specimens have been found in the nests of Odontotermes wallonensis and Odontotermes brunneus.
