= Aethiopicodynerus capensis =

Scientific classification
- Domain: Eukaryota
- Kingdom: Animalia
- Phylum: Arthropoda
- Class: Insecta
- Order: Hymenoptera
- Family: Vespidae
- Genus: Aethiopicodynerus
- Species: A. capensis

Binomial name
- Aethiopicodynerus capensis (de Saussure, 1856)

Species of wasp

Aethiopicodynerus capensis is a species of wasp in the family Vespidae. It was described by de Saussure in 1856.
