= Hemicorythoderus =

Scientific classification
- Kingdom: Animalia
- Phylum: Arthropoda
- Clade: Pancrustacea
- Class: Insecta
- Order: Coleoptera
- Suborder: Polyphaga
- Infraorder: Scarabaeiformia
- Family: Scarabaeidae
- Subfamily: Aphodiinae
- Tribe: Corythoderini
- Genus: Hemicorythoderus; Tangelder & Krikken, 1982
- Species: H. vaneyeni

Binomial name
- Hemicorythoderus vaneyeni (Paulian, 1947)

Synonyms
- Corythoderus vaneyeni Paulian, 1947

Genus of beetles

Hemicorythoderus is a genus of beetle of the family Scarabaeidae. It is monotypic, being represented by the single species, Hemicorythoderus vaneyeni, which is found in the Democratic Republic of the Congo.

== Description ==
They have a dark black-brown body.
