= Acarodynerus clypeatus =

Scientific classification
- Domain: Eukaryota
- Kingdom: Animalia
- Phylum: Arthropoda
- Class: Insecta
- Order: Hymenoptera
- Family: Vespidae
- Genus: Acarodynerus
- Species: A. clypeatus

Binomial name
- Acarodynerus clypeatus (Saussure, 1853)

Species of wasp

Acarodynerus clypeatus is a species of wasp in the family Vespidae. It was described by Saussure in 1853.
