= Aethiopicodynerus punctiventris =

Scientific classification
- Domain: Eukaryota
- Kingdom: Animalia
- Phylum: Arthropoda
- Class: Insecta
- Order: Hymenoptera
- Family: Vespidae
- Genus: Aethiopicodynerus
- Species: A. punctiventris

Binomial name
- Aethiopicodynerus punctiventris (Gusenleitner, 2002)

Species of wasp

Aethiopicodynerus punctiventris is a species of wasp in the family Vespidae. It was described by Gusenleitner in 2002.
