= Tachymenes =

Scientific classification
- Domain: Eukaryota
- Kingdom: Animalia
- Phylum: Arthropoda
- Class: Insecta
- Order: Hymenoptera
- Family: Vespidae
- Subfamily: Eumeninae
- Genus: Tachymenes; Giordani Soika, 1983

Type species
- Tachymenes vulneratus (Saussure, 1855)

Species
- Tachymenes abruptus Gusenleitner, 2002; Tachymenes ornativentris (Cameron, 1910); Tachymenes vulneratus (Saussure, 1855)

Genus of wasps

Tachymenes is a small (3 species currently recognized) Afrotropical genus of potter wasps restricted to Southern Africa.
