= Allepipona splendida =

Scientific classification
- Kingdom: Animalia
- Phylum: Arthropoda
- Clade: Pancrustacea
- Class: Insecta
- Order: Hymenoptera
- Family: Vespidae
- Genus: Allepipona
- Species: A. splendida

Binomial name
- Allepipona splendida Gusenleitner, 1997

Species of wasp

Allepipona splendida is a species of wasp in the Vespidae family. It was described by Gusenleitner in 1997. It belongs to the genus Allepipona.
