= Chaetopisthes meridionalis =

Scientific classification
- Kingdom: Animalia
- Phylum: Arthropoda
- Clade: Pancrustacea
- Class: Insecta
- Order: Coleoptera
- Suborder: Polyphaga
- Infraorder: Scarabaeiformia
- Family: Scarabaeidae
- Genus: Chaetopisthes
- Species: C. meridionalis

Binomial name
- Chaetopisthes meridionalis Tangelder & Krikken, 1982

Species of beetle

Chaetopisthes meridionalis is a species of beetle of the family Scarabaeidae. It is found in India (Tamil Nadu).

== Description ==
Adults reach a length of about 3.4–3.6 mm (0.13–0.14 in). They have a shiny, dark brown body, with pale yellow pilosity.
