= Acarodynerus batchelorensis =

Scientific classification
- Domain: Eukaryota
- Kingdom: Animalia
- Phylum: Arthropoda
- Class: Insecta
- Order: Hymenoptera
- Family: Vespidae
- Genus: Acarodynerus
- Species: A. batchelorensis

Binomial name
- Acarodynerus batchelorensis Borsato, 1994

Species of wasp

Acarodynerus batchelorensis is a species of wasp in the family Vespidae. It was described by Borsato in 1994.
