= Afroxanthodynerus =

Scientific classification
- Kingdom: Animalia
- Phylum: Arthropoda
- Clade: Pancrustacea
- Class: Insecta
- Order: Hymenoptera
- Family: Vespidae
- Subfamily: Eumeninae
- Genus: Afroxanthodynerus; Giordani Soika, 1979

Species
- Afroxanthodynerus baidoensis; Afroxanthodynerus nigeriensis (type species)

Genus of wasps

Afroxanthodynerus is an Afrotropical genus of potter wasps that belongs to the family Vespidae. The type species is Afroxanthodynerus nigeriensis.
