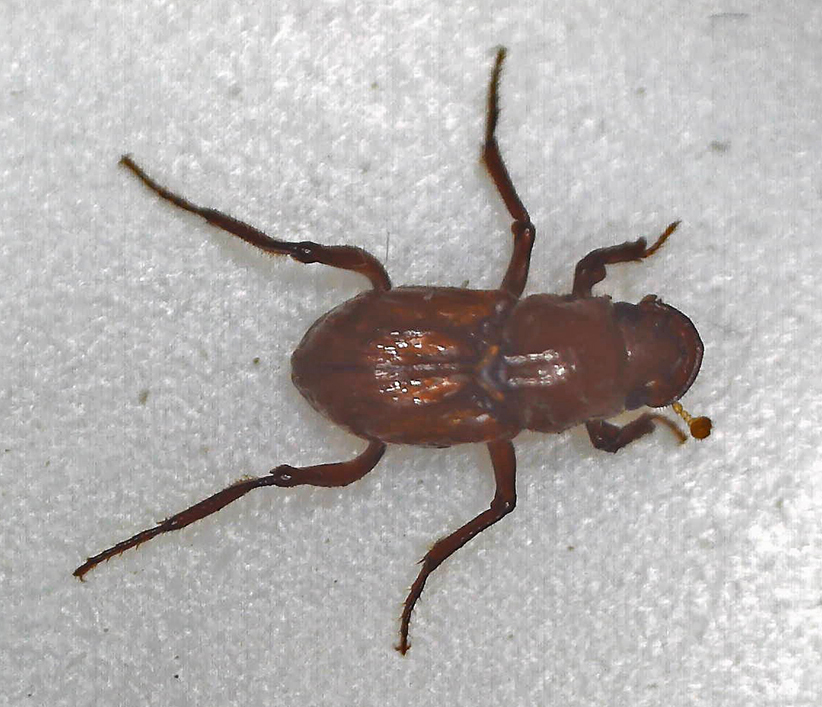
- Paracorythoderus marshalli

Scientific classification
- Kingdom: Animalia
- Phylum: Arthropoda
- Clade: Pancrustacea
- Class: Insecta
- Order: Coleoptera
- Suborder: Polyphaga
- Infraorder: Scarabaeiformia
- Family: Scarabaeidae
- Subfamily: Aphodiinae
- Tribe: Corythoderini
- Genus: Paracorythoderus; Wasmann, 1918

= Paracorythoderus =

Genus of beetles

Paracorythoderus is a genus of beetles of the family Scarabaeidae.

== Species ==
- Paracorythoderus casperi (Kolbe, 1909)
- Paracorythoderus endroedyi Endrödi, 1991
- Paracorythoderus marshalli (Brauns, 1900)
- Paracorythoderus ridens Tangelder & Krikken, 1982
