= Chaetopisthes =

Scientific classification
- Kingdom: Animalia
- Phylum: Arthropoda
- Clade: Pancrustacea
- Class: Insecta
- Order: Coleoptera
- Suborder: Polyphaga
- Infraorder: Scarabaeiformia
- Family: Scarabaeidae
- Subfamily: Aphodiinae
- Tribe: Corythoderini
- Genus: Chaetopisthes; Westwood, 1847

Genus of beetles

Chaetopisthes is a genus of beetles of the family Scarabaeidae.

== Species ==
- Subgenus Chaetopisthes
  - Chaetopisthes fulvoides Tangelder & Krikken, 1982
  - Chaetopisthes fulvus Westwood, 1847
  - Chaetopisthes latipes Tangelder & Krikken, 1982
  - Chaetopisthes oberthueri Tangelder & Krikken, 1982
- Subgenus Chaetopisthides Wasmann, 1918
  - Chaetopisthes popei Tangelder & Krikken, 1982
  - Chaetopisthes sulciger Wasmann, 1899
- Subgenus Miochaetopisthes Tangelder & Krikken, 1982
  - Chaetopisthes cincinnatus Tangelder & Krikken, 1982
- Subgenus Neochaetopisthes Wasmann, 1918
  - Chaetopisthes angustipes Tangelder & Krikken, 1982
  - Chaetopisthes assmuthi Wasmann, 1903
  - Chaetopisthes brevipes Champion & Wasmann, 1923
  - Chaetopisthes brunneus Wasmann, 1918
  - Chaetopisthes heimi Wasmann, 1903
  - Chaetopisthes longulus Champion & Wasmann, 1923
  - Chaetopisthes meridionalis Tangelder & Krikken, 1982
  - Chaetopisthes saetiger Tangelder & Krikken, 1982
  - Chaetopisthes semisulcatus Tangelder & Krikken, 1982
  - Chaetopisthes septentrionalis Tangelder & Krikken, 1982
  - Chaetopisthes simplicipes Gestro, 1891
  - Chaetopisthes singalensis Champion & Wasmann, 1923
  - Chaetopisthes ventriosus Tangelder & Krikken, 1982
