= Allepipona similis =

Scientific classification
- Domain: Eukaryota
- Kingdom: Animalia
- Phylum: Arthropoda
- Class: Insecta
- Order: Hymenoptera
- Family: Vespidae
- Subfamily: Eumeninae
- Genus: Allepipona
- Species: A. similis

Binomial name
- Allepipona similis Gusenleitner, 2000

Species of wasp

Allepipona similis is a species of wasp in the Vespidae family. It was described by Gusenleitner in 2000 and listed in Catalogue of Life: 2011 Annual Checklist.
