= Acarodynerus propodealaris =

Scientific classification
- Kingdom: Animalia
- Phylum: Arthropoda
- Clade: Pancrustacea
- Class: Insecta
- Order: Hymenoptera
- Family: Vespidae
- Genus: Acarodynerus
- Species: A. propodealaris

Binomial name
- Acarodynerus propodealaris Giordani Soika, 1961

Species of wasp

Acarodynerus propodealaris is a species of wasp in the family Vespidae.
