= Chaetopisthes sulciger =

Scientific classification
- Kingdom: Animalia
- Phylum: Arthropoda
- Clade: Pancrustacea
- Class: Insecta
- Order: Coleoptera
- Suborder: Polyphaga
- Infraorder: Scarabaeiformia
- Family: Scarabaeidae
- Genus: Chaetopisthes
- Species: C. sulciger

Binomial name
- Chaetopisthes sulciger Wasmann, 1899

Synonyms
- Chaetopisthes (Chaetopisthides) tibialis Champion & Wasmann, 1923

Species of beetle

Chaetopisthes sulciger is a species of beetle of the family Scarabaeidae. It is found in India (Madhya Pradesh, Maharashtra).

== Description ==
Adults reach a length of about 3.7–3.8 mm (0.15–0.15 in) for males and 4.1 mm (0.16 in) for females. They have an elongate, rather flat, highly lustrous, yellowish-brown to light rust-red body, which is sparsely covered with white hairs.

== Life history ==
Specimens have been found in the nests of Odontotermes wallonensis.
