= Acarodynerus triangulum =

Scientific classification
- Domain: Eukaryota
- Kingdom: Animalia
- Phylum: Arthropoda
- Class: Insecta
- Order: Hymenoptera
- Family: Vespidae
- Genus: Acarodynerus
- Species: A. triangulum

Binomial name
- Acarodynerus triangulum (Saussure, 1855)

Species of wasp

Acarodynerus triangulum is a species of wasp in the family Vespidae. It was described by Saussure in 1855.
