= Paracorythoderus ridens =

Scientific classification
- Kingdom: Animalia
- Phylum: Arthropoda
- Clade: Pancrustacea
- Class: Insecta
- Order: Coleoptera
- Suborder: Polyphaga
- Infraorder: Scarabaeiformia
- Family: Scarabaeidae
- Genus: Paracorythoderus
- Species: P. ridens

Binomial name
- Paracorythoderus ridens Tangelder & Krikken, 1982

Species of beetle

Paracorythoderus ridens is a species of beetle of the family Scarabaeidae. It is found in Namibia.

== Description ==
Adults reach a length of about 2.4–2.6 mm (0.094–0.102 in) for males and 2.5–2.7 mm (0.098–0.106 in) for females. They have a shiny, bright brown body, with yellow-white to dark brown pilosity.
