= Chaetopisthes cincinnatus =

Scientific classification
- Kingdom: Animalia
- Phylum: Arthropoda
- Clade: Pancrustacea
- Class: Insecta
- Order: Coleoptera
- Suborder: Polyphaga
- Infraorder: Scarabaeiformia
- Family: Scarabaeidae
- Genus: Chaetopisthes
- Species: C. cincinnatus

Binomial name
- Chaetopisthes cincinnatus Tangelder & Krikken, 1982

Species of beetle

Chaetopisthes cincinnatus is a species of beetle of the family Scarabaeidae. It is found in India (Andhra Pradesh).

== Description ==
Adults reach a length of about 2.7 mm (0.11 in). They have a shiny, light-brown body, with yellow-white pilosity.
