= Chaetopisthes brunneus =

Scientific classification
- Kingdom: Animalia
- Phylum: Arthropoda
- Clade: Pancrustacea
- Class: Insecta
- Order: Coleoptera
- Suborder: Polyphaga
- Infraorder: Scarabaeiformia
- Family: Scarabaeidae
- Genus: Chaetopisthes
- Species: C. brunneus

Binomial name
- Chaetopisthes brunneus Wasmann, 1918

Species of beetle

Chaetopisthes brunneus is a species of beetle of the family Scarabaeidae. It is found in India (Maharashtra).

== Description ==
Adults reach a length of about 3.7 mm (0.15 in) for males and 4.1–4.4 mm (0.16–0.17 in) for females. They have a rather dark reddish-brown body, covered with fairly dense, long, whitish hairs.

== Life history ==
Specimens have been found in the nests of Odontotermes brunneus.
