= Chaetopisthes semisulcatus =

Scientific classification
- Kingdom: Animalia
- Phylum: Arthropoda
- Clade: Pancrustacea
- Class: Insecta
- Order: Coleoptera
- Suborder: Polyphaga
- Infraorder: Scarabaeiformia
- Family: Scarabaeidae
- Genus: Chaetopisthes
- Species: C. semisulcatus

Binomial name
- Chaetopisthes semisulcatus Tangelder & Krikken, 1982

Species of beetle

Chaetopisthes semisulcatus is a species of beetle of the family Scarabaeidae. It is found in India (Andhra Pradesh).

== Description ==
Adults reach a length of about 2.9–3 mm (0.11–0.12 in). They have a shiny, yellow-brown body, with pale pilosity.
