= Chaetopisthes singalensis =

Scientific classification
- Kingdom: Animalia
- Phylum: Arthropoda
- Clade: Pancrustacea
- Class: Insecta
- Order: Coleoptera
- Suborder: Polyphaga
- Infraorder: Scarabaeiformia
- Family: Scarabaeidae
- Genus: Chaetopisthes
- Species: C. singalensis

Binomial name
- Chaetopisthes singalensis Champion & Wasmann, 1923

Species of beetle

Chaetopisthes singalensis is a species of beetle of the family Scarabaeidae. It is found in Sri Lanka.

== Description ==
Adults reach a length of about 3.3 mm (0.13 in). They have an oblong, strongly convex, shiny, light yellowish-brown body, with fine, short, and sparse pubescence.
