= Allepipona erythrospila =

Scientific classification
- Domain: Eukaryota
- Kingdom: Animalia
- Phylum: Arthropoda
- Class: Insecta
- Order: Hymenoptera
- Family: Vespidae
- Subfamily: Eumeninae
- Genus: Allepipona
- Species: A. erythrospila

Binomial name
- Allepipona erythrospila (Cameron, 1905)

Species of wasp

Allepipona erythrospila is a species of wasp in the Vespidae family. It was described by Cameron in 1905.
