= Aethiopicodynerus scripticeps =

Scientific classification
- Domain: Eukaryota
- Kingdom: Animalia
- Phylum: Arthropoda
- Class: Insecta
- Order: Hymenoptera
- Family: Vespidae
- Genus: Aethiopicodynerus
- Species: A. scripticeps

Binomial name
- Aethiopicodynerus scripticeps (Cameron, 1910)

Species of wasp

Aethiopicodynerus scripticeps is a species of wasp in the family Vespidae. It was described by Cameron in 1910.
