= Termitopisthes =

- Termitopisthes wasmanni

Scientific classification
- Kingdom: Animalia
- Phylum: Arthropoda
- Clade: Pancrustacea
- Class: Insecta
- Order: Coleoptera
- Suborder: Polyphaga
- Infraorder: Scarabaeiformia
- Family: Scarabaeidae
- Subfamily: Aphodiinae
- Tribe: Corythoderini
- Genus: Termitopisthes; Wasmann, 1918

Genus of beetles

Termitopisthes is a genus of beetles of the family Scarabaeidae.

== Species ==
- Termitopisthes forticulus Tangelder & Krikken, 1982
- Termitopisthes kistneri Tangelder & Krikken, 1982
- Termitopisthes parallelus Champion & Wasmann, 1923
- Termitopisthes schmidti Champion & Wasmann, 1923
- Termitopisthes submissus Tangelder & Krikken, 1982
- Termitopisthes termiticola (Gestro, 1891)
- Termitopisthes wasmanni (Schmidt, 1910)
