= Termitopisthes parallelus =

Scientific classification
- Kingdom: Animalia
- Phylum: Arthropoda
- Clade: Pancrustacea
- Class: Insecta
- Order: Coleoptera
- Suborder: Polyphaga
- Infraorder: Scarabaeiformia
- Family: Scarabaeidae
- Genus: Termitopisthes
- Species: T. parallelus

Binomial name
- Termitopisthes parallelus Champion & Wasmann, 1923

Species of beetle

Termitopisthes parallelus is a species of beetle of the family Scarabaeidae. It is found in India (Uttarakhand).

== Description ==
Adults reach a length of about 3 mm (0.12 in). They have an almost parallel-sided, dark reddish-brown body. The elytra are densely covered with white hairs.
