= Acarodynerus posttegulatus =

Scientific classification
- Domain: Eukaryota
- Kingdom: Animalia
- Phylum: Arthropoda
- Class: Insecta
- Order: Hymenoptera
- Family: Vespidae
- Genus: Acarodynerus
- Species: A. posttegulatus

Binomial name
- Acarodynerus posttegulatus (Giordani Soika, 1937)

Species of wasp

Acarodynerus posttegulatus is a species of wasp in the family Vespidae. It was described by Giordani Soika in 1937.
