= Chaetopisthes latipes =

Scientific classification
- Kingdom: Animalia
- Phylum: Arthropoda
- Clade: Pancrustacea
- Class: Insecta
- Order: Coleoptera
- Suborder: Polyphaga
- Infraorder: Scarabaeiformia
- Family: Scarabaeidae
- Genus: Chaetopisthes
- Species: C. latipes

Binomial name
- Chaetopisthes latipes Tangelder & Krikken, 1982

Species of beetle

Chaetopisthes latipes is a species of beetle of the family Scarabaeidae. It is found in India (Andhra Pradesh).

== Description ==
Adults reach a length of about 3.4 mm (0.13 in) for males and 3.7–3.8 mm (0.15–0.15 in) for females. They have a shiny, light yellow-brown body, with pale yellow pilosity.
