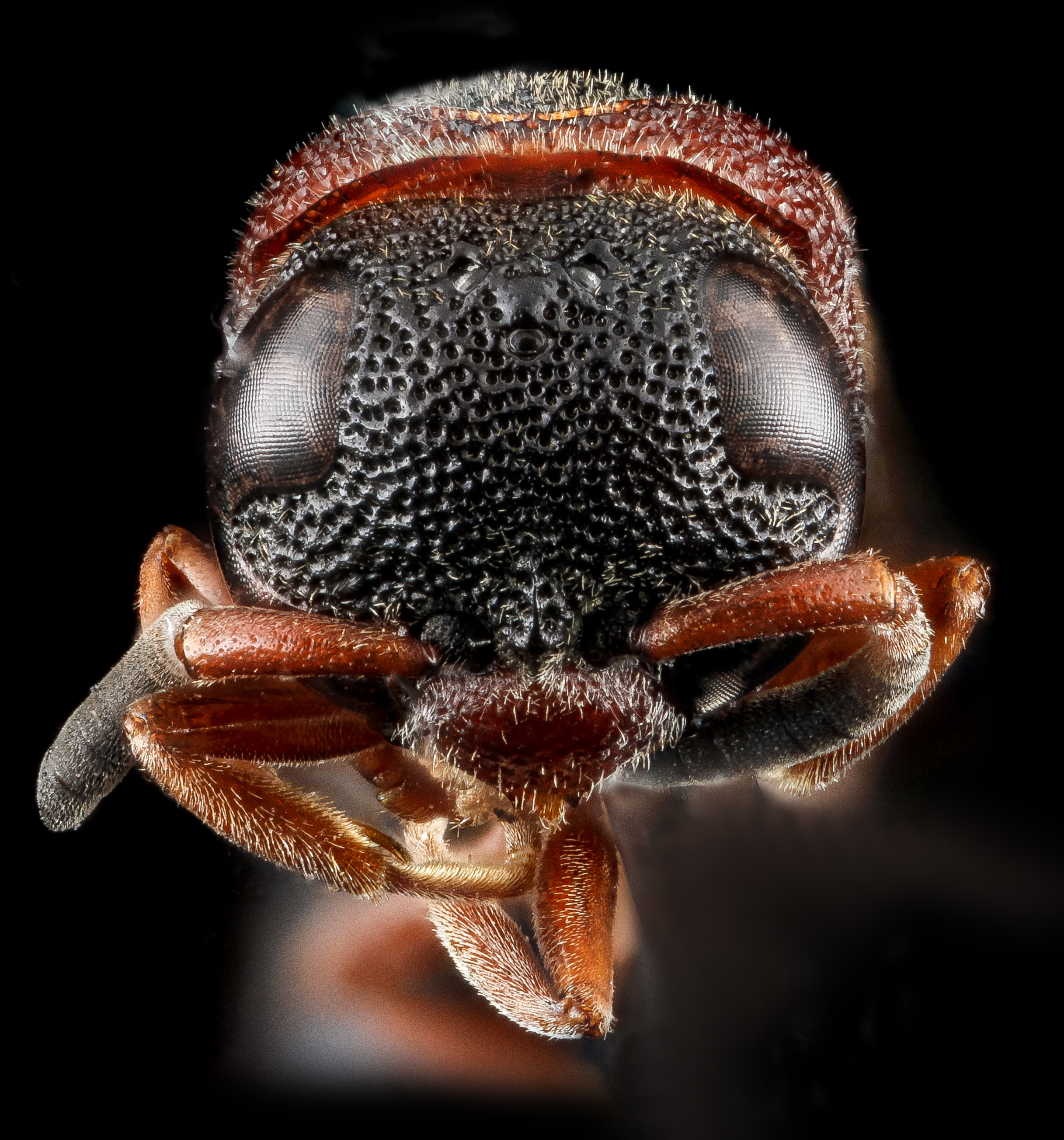

Scientific classification
- Domain: Eukaryota
- Kingdom: Animalia
- Phylum: Arthropoda
- Class: Insecta
- Order: Hymenoptera
- Family: Vespidae
- Genus: Leptochilus
- Species: L. acolhuus

Binomial name
- Leptochilus acolhuus (de Saussure, 1857)

= Leptochilus acolhuus =

Species of wasp

Leptochilus acolhuus is a species of stinging wasp in the family Vespidae.

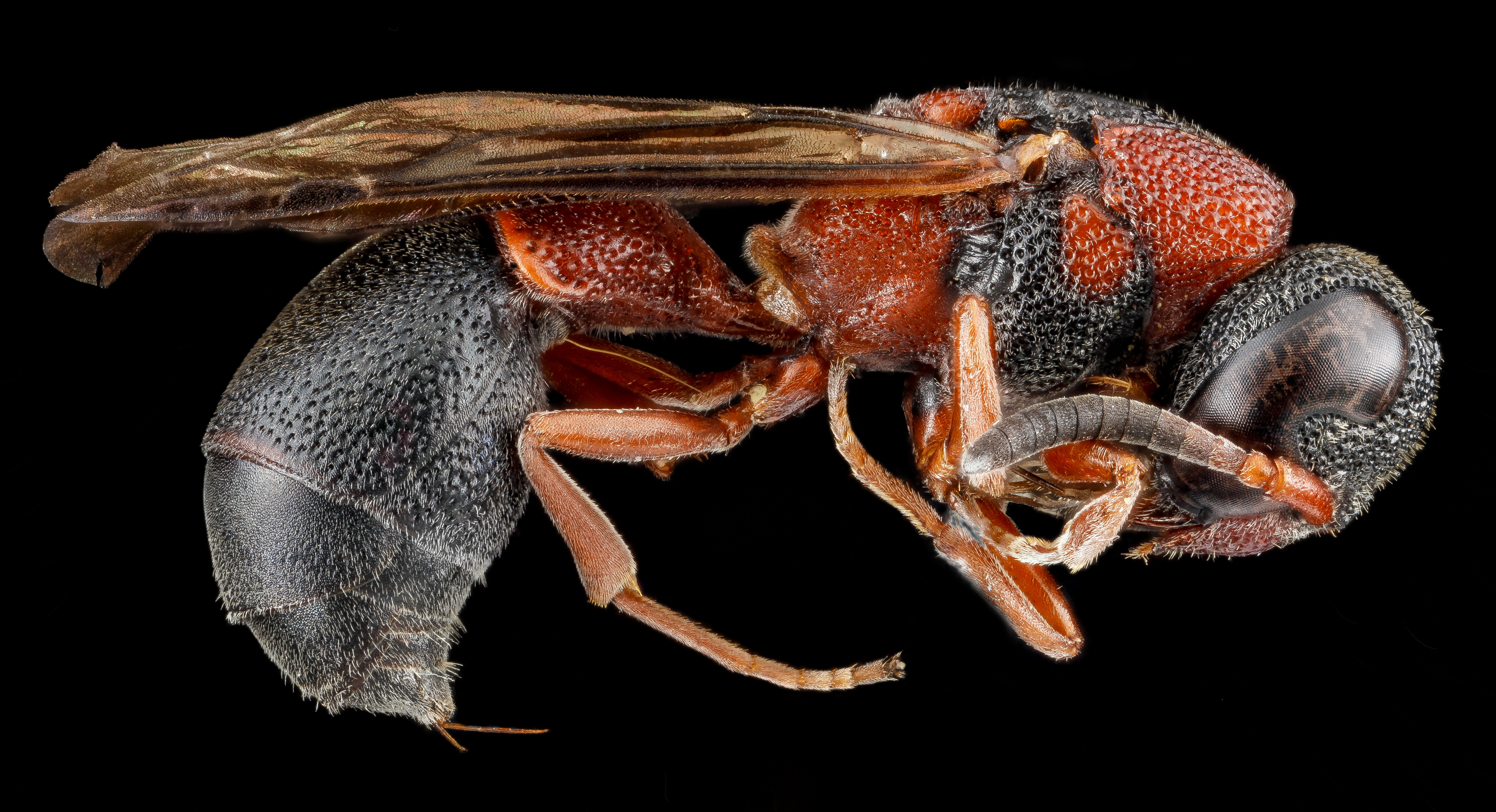
