= Eumenidiopsis =

Scientific classification
- Kingdom: Animalia
- Phylum: Arthropoda
- Class: Insecta
- Order: Hymenoptera
- Family: Vespidae
- Subfamily: Eumeninae
- Genus: Eumenidiopsis; Giordani Soika, 1939

Species
- See text

Genus of wasps

Eumenidiopsis is an afrotropical genus of Afrotropical potter wasps with eight known species, which are set out below:

- Eumenidiopsis astutus (Kohl, 1906)
- Eumenidiopsis bacilliformis (Giordani Soika, 1940)
- Eumenidiopsis jacoti Giordani Soika, 1977
- Eumenidiopsis mixtus (Giordani Soika, 1943)
- Eumenidiopsis nigritus (Kohl, 1906)
- Eumenidiopsis nitens (Giordani Soika, 1939)
- Eumenidiopsis striativentris (Giordani Soika, 1940)
- Eumenidiopsis subtilis (Giordani Soika, 1939)
