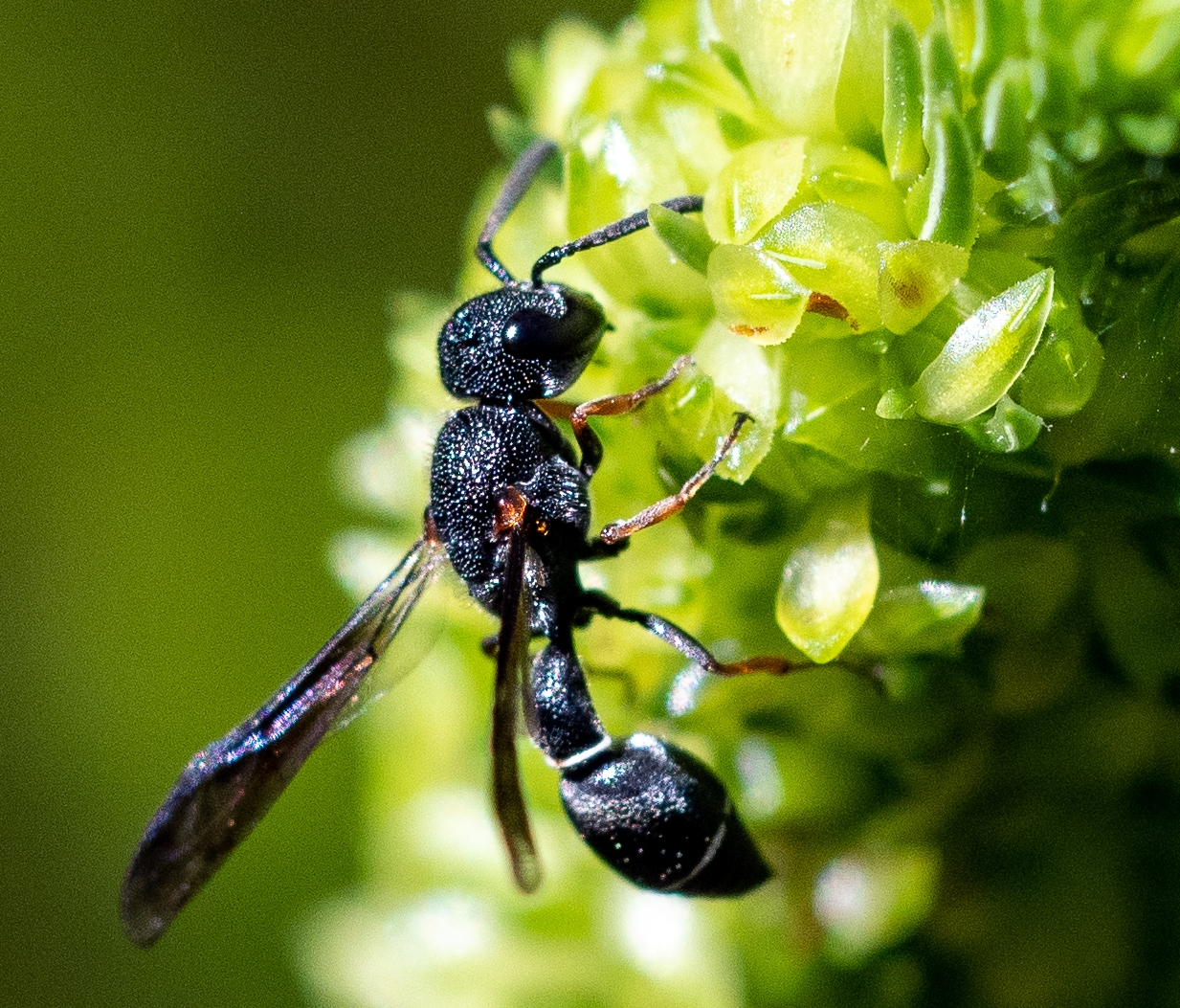

Scientific classification
- Domain: Eukaryota
- Kingdom: Animalia
- Phylum: Arthropoda
- Class: Insecta
- Order: Hymenoptera
- Family: Vespidae
- Subfamily: Eumeninae
- Genus: Stroudia; Gribodo, 1892

Type species
- Stroudia armata Gribodo, 1892

= Stroudia =

Genus of wasps

Stroudia is an Afrotropical genus of potter wasps.

== Species ==
The following species are among those included in Stroudia:

- Stroudia abnormis Gusenleitner, 2001
- Stroudia aestimabilis Giordani Soika, 1989
- Stroudia albofasciata Gusenleitner, 2002
- Stroudia anarchica Giordani Soika, 1977
- Stroudia anomaliventris Giordani Soika, 1987
- Stroudia areata (Giordani Soika, 1940)
- Stroudia areatoides Gusenleitner, 2002
- Stroudia armata (Gribodo, 1907)
- Stroudia basipunctata Giordani Soika, 1977
- Stroudia bellicosa Giordani Soika, 1992
- Stroudia bidentella Giordani Soika, 1977
- Stroudia brevior (Giordani Soika, 1943)
- Stroudia corallina Giordani Soika, 1989
- Stroudia despecta Gusenleitner, 2002
- Stroudia difficilis Giordani Soika, 1977
- Stroudia emarginata Giordani Soika, 1977
- Stroudia emilaevigata Giordani Soika, 1977
- Stroudia eumeniformis (Giordani Soika, 1943)
- Stroudia fusiformis Giordani Soika, 1987
- Stroudia guillarmodi Giordani Soika, 1983
- Stroudia hertae Gusenleitner, 2002
- Stroudia hessei (Giordani Soika, 1940)
- Stroudia hirta Gusenleitner, 2002
- Stroudia inaequalis Giordani Soika, 1987
- Stroudia incuriosa Giordani Soika, 1989
- Stroudia insueta Giordani Soika, 1977
- Stroudia juvenilis Giordani Soika, 1977
- Stroudia kaokoveldensis (Giordani Soika, 1943)
- Stroudia laikipia Gusenleitner, 2002
- Stroudia longissima (Giordani Soika, 1939)
- Stroudia longula (Giordani Soika, 1939)
- Stroudia manca Gusenleitner, 2007
- Stroudia marcelli Giordani Soika, 1987
- Stroudia meridiana Gusenleitner, 2007
- Stroudia micella (Giordani Soika, 1940)
- Stroudia minima Giordani Soika, 1992
- Stroudia moesta (Giordani Soika, 1943)
- Stroudia nodosa Giordani Soika, 1977
- Stroudia pacifica Giordani Soika, 1977
- Stroudia plumosa Giordani Soika, 1992
- Stroudia pseudeumenes Giordani Soika, 1989
- Stroudia pulcherrima Giordani Soika, 1977
- Stroudia pulla (Giordani Soika, 1940)
- Stroudia punctaticornis (Giordani Soika, 1940)
- Stroudia raphiglossoides (Giordani Soika, 1940)
- Stroudia rufipetiolata (von Schulthess-Rechberg, 1913)
- Stroudia sexpunctata (Giordani Soika, 1943)
- Stroudia simillima (Giordani Soika, 1940)
- Stroudia simplicissima Giordani Soika, 1977
- Stroudia spinicornis Giordani Soika, 1977
- Stroudia stenosoma (Giordani Soika, 1941)
- Stroudia striatella Giordani Soika, 1977
- Stroudia striatelloides Giordani Soika, 1977)
- Stroudia striaticlypeus Gusenleitner, 2002
- Stroudia tarsata Gusenleitner, 2007
- Stroudia tricolor Giordani Soika, 1992
