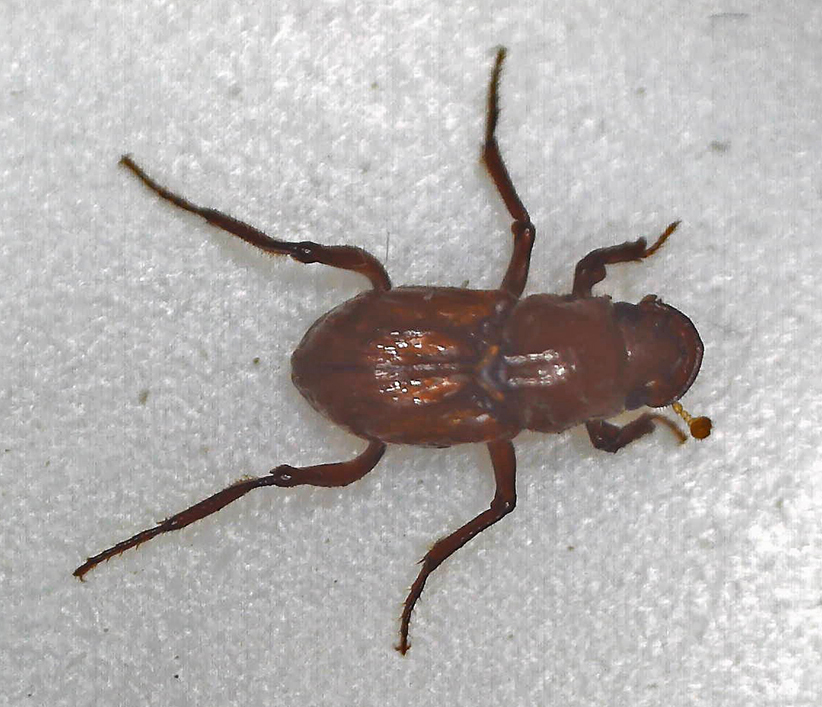

Scientific classification
- Kingdom: Animalia
- Phylum: Arthropoda
- Clade: Pancrustacea
- Class: Insecta
- Order: Coleoptera
- Suborder: Polyphaga
- Infraorder: Scarabaeiformia
- Family: Scarabaeidae
- Genus: Paracorythoderus
- Species: P. marshalli

Binomial name
- Paracorythoderus marshalli (Brauns, 1900)

Synonyms
- Corythoderus marshalli Brauns, 1900

= Paracorythoderus marshalli =

Species of beetle

Paracorythoderus marshalli is a species of beetle of the family Scarabaeidae. It is found in South Africa (Free State, Gauteng).

== Description ==
Adults reach a length of about 2.7–3.1 mm (0.11–0.12 in) for males and 2.9–3.1 mm (0.11–0.12 in) for females.

== Life history ==
Specimens have been collected from queen cells in the nests of Odontotermes transvaalensis and Odontotermes badius, as well as in the nests of Odontotermes latericus.
