= Anton Schulthess-Rechberg =

Swiss medical doctor and entomologist

Anton von Schulthess-Rechberg (also known as Anton von Schulthess-Schindler; 14 January 1855 – 7 November 1941) was a Swiss medical doctor and entomologist.

== Biography ==
He was the son of the banker and railway investor Gustav Anton von Schulthess-Rechberg. He graduated in medicine in 1879 from the University of Zurich and was appointed an assistant physician in Zürich hospitals from 1879. From 1886 to 1898 he was the leading doctor in the Swiss Institute for Epilepsy. He opened a private practice in 1898, from 1915 to 1928 he was president of the Swiss Public Utilities Society (Société suisse d'utilité publique) and from 1929 to 1939 he was president of the Swiss Red Cross. As an amateur entomologist he was concerned mainly with the African Hymenoptera. He was a colonel in the Swiss Army Commission sanitaire de l'armée between 1894 and 1918, he was awarded a Doctor of Philosophy by the University of Zurich in 1935. In 1925 he was president of the International Entomological Congress in Zürich.

== Publications ==
- 1911 Die kulturelle Bedeutung der Tuberkulose Tuberkulose-Kommission
