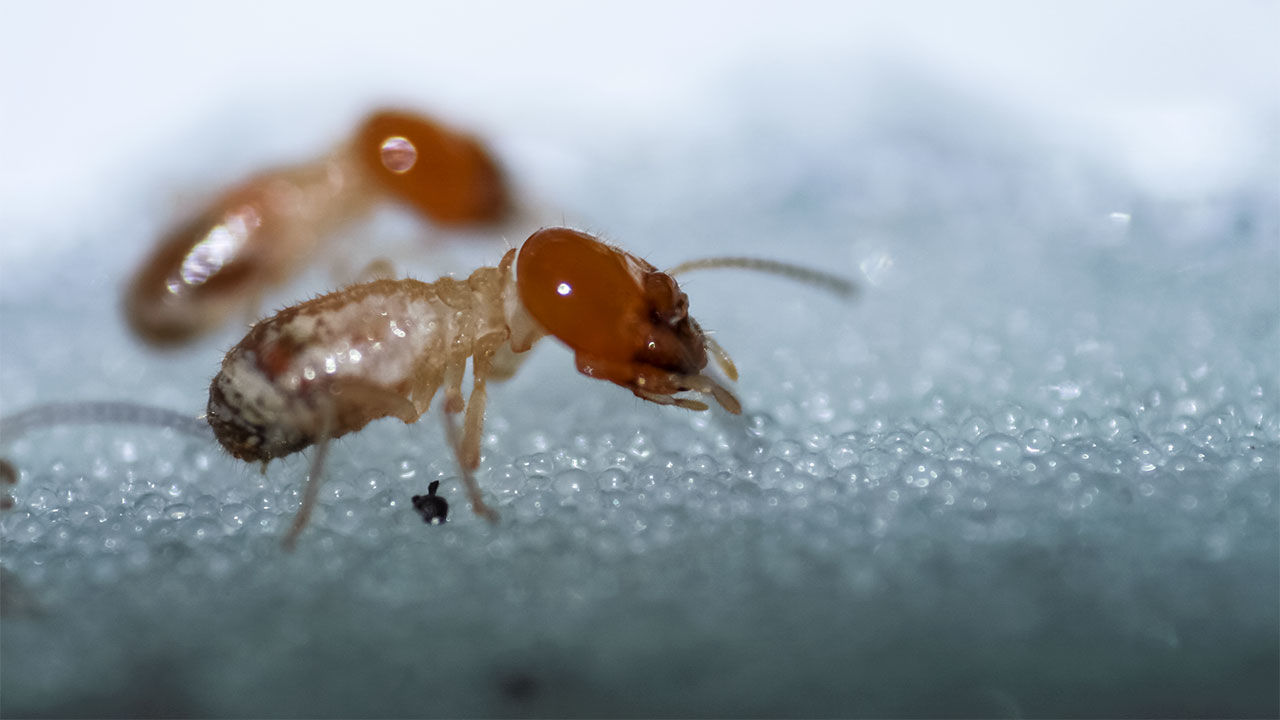

Scientific classification
- Domain: Eukaryota
- Kingdom: Animalia
- Phylum: Arthropoda
- Class: Insecta
- Order: Blattodea
- Infraorder: Isoptera
- Family: Termitidae
- Genus: Odontotermes
- Species: O. obesus

Binomial name
- Odontotermes obesus (Rambur 1842)

Synonyms
- Termes obesus Rambur 1842

= Odontotermes obesus =

Species of termite

Odontotermes obesus is a species of termite in the family Termitidae. It is native to tropical southwestern Asia. This termite cultivates a symbiotic fungus in a special chamber in the nest. Workers gather vegetable detritus which they bring back to the colony, chewing up the material to make a suitable substrate on which the fungus will grow.

== The colony ==
Termites of this species swarm from April and May onwards, before and during the wet season. After their nuptial flight, a pair of winged termites will search for a soil crevice or loose soil in which to establish their nest. The initial structure is a cone-shaped mound, with cone-shaped turrets; the fungus garden (sometimes called the comb) is at the centre of the cone with the royal chamber beneath. Galleries, runways and vaults are added as the colony expands, and the nest principally grows upwards.

== Ecology ==
The colony feeds exclusively on the fungus that they grow in their underground fungus garden. The workers forage for suitable materials to use as a substrate for their fungus garden, gathering bark, wood fragments, dead leaves and dry dung, and in so doing do considerable damage to crops including wheat, barley, maize, pearl millet, sorghum, sugarcane, groundnut and tea. The material they gather is chewed up and bacteria in their gut help them to digest the cellulose by contributing enzymes such as cellulase and xylanase. The comb is constantly being reprocessed by being passed through the guts of worker termites, which feed on the oldest parts and produce new comb. The fungal hyphae grow swiftly through the newly processed comb. The fungus sometimes produces spherules, asexual reproductive bodies; these are eaten by the workers and also transported intact to be deposited in other parts of the fungus comb.

The establishment of the fungal comb has been studied in a limited number of species. In some, the spherules are swallowed by the winged alates before they swarm, either the males or the females according to species, and retained as a bolus in the gut, the faeces later being used to establish a fungal comb in the new colony. In other species, such as Odontotermes montanus, spherules are not transported, and the comb is established when foraging workers bring back basidiospores which come from the fruiting bodies (mushrooms) of the fungus which grow above ground on the termite mound.
