= Antonio Giordani Soika =

Italian entomologist, ecologist and museum director

Antonio Giordani Soika (9 May 1913 – 2 January 1997) was an Italian entomologist, ecologist and director of the Civic Museum of Natural History of Venice (Museo Civico di Storia Naturale). He had a long career in which he worked on various groups of insects but much of his work was on the Hymenoptera. He made great contributions to the knowledge of Neotropical wasps, especially potter wasps for which he produced many taxonomic keys and also monographs on the systematics of the wasp family Vespidae.

== Publications ==
Below is a partial list of the extensive published work of Antonio Giordani Soika:

- 1941 Studi sui Vespidi solitari VI. Studio di alcuni tipi di vespidi solitary Boll. Mus .Civ. Stor. nat. Venezia 2
- 1942 Monografia degli Alastor etiopici (Hym. Vesp.). - Mitteilungen der Münchner Entomologischen Gesellschaft 032: 399-445
- 1949 Studi sulle olocenosi - III. Boll. Soc. Ven. St. Nat. e Mus. Civ. St. Nat. Venezia, 4: 62-99.
- 1950 Studi sulle olocenosi - V. Boll. Soc. Ven. St. Nat. e Mus. Civ. St. Nat. Venezia, 5: 1-16.
- 1958 Notulae Vespidologicae. Bollettino del Museo Civico di Storia Naturale di Venezia 11: 35-102.
- 1968 Ergebnisse der zoologischen Nubien-Expedition 1962 Teil XXXVI Eumenidae. - Annalen des Naturhistorischen Museums in Wien 72: 527-528.
- 1974 L'inquinamento della Laguna di Venezia: studio delle modificazioni chimiche e del popolamento sot-tobasale dei sedimenti lagunari negli ultimi vent'anni. Boll. Mus. Civ. St. Nat. Venezia, 26:25-68 (with G. Perin)
- 1974 Eumenidi di Socotra ed Abd-el-Kuri. Bollettino del Museo Civico di Storia Naturale di Venezia 25: 69-85.
- 1975 Sul genere Zeta (Sauss.). Boll. Mus. Civ. Stor. Nat. Venezia 27 : 111 – 135
- 1976 Venezia e il problema delle acque alte. Suppl. vol. 27 Boll. Mus. Civ. St. Nat. Venezia, 118 p
- 1978 Revisione degli Eumenidi neotropicali appartenenti ai generi Eumenes Latr., Omicron Sauss., Pararhaphidoglossa Schulth. ed affini. Boll Mus Civ Stor Nat Venezia 29 1-420
- 1978 Tabella per L'Identificazionedei Generi Europei della Faliglia Eumenidae (Hym. Vesp.)Societa Veneziana di Scienze Naturali Lavori 3 30-41
- 1989 Terzo contributo alla conoscenza degli eumenidi afrotropicali (Hymenoptera). Societa Veneziana di Scienze Naturali Lavori 14(1)
- 1990 Revisione degli Eumenidi neotropicali appartenenti ai generi Pachymenes Sauss., Santamenes n. gen, Brachymenes G.S., Pseudacaromenes G.S., Stenosigma G.S. e Gamma Zav. Boll Mus Civ Stor Nat Venezia 39 71-172
- 1992 Di alcuni Eumenidi nuovi o poco noti (Hymenoptera Vespoidea). Lavori – Società Veneziana di Scienze Naturali 17: 41-68.

== Species named for Giordani Soika ==
The following species are some of those that have been in honour after Giordani Soika: the spider Euryopis giordanii, the Eumenid wasp Subancistrocerus giordanii, dolichopod fly Syntormon giordani and the carabid beetle Orotrechus giordanii.
