= Calliaster nazaninae =

Scientific classification
- Kingdom: Animalia
- Phylum: Echinodermata
- Class: Asteroidea
- Order: Valvatida
- Family: Goniasteridae
- Genus: Calliaster
- Species: C. nazaninae

Binomial name
- Calliaster nazaninae Mah, 2026

Species of sea star

Calliaster nazaninae is a species of sea star in the family Goniasteridae found off New Caledonia.

== Etymology ==
The species is named for Sara Nazanin Alexander of the Integrated Taxonomic Information System (ITIS).

== Taxonomy and systematics ==
This species shows a marked contrast to Calliaster hystrix and Calliaster kyros in having observably few spines, with the disk armament especially minimized. It shows some resemblance to the Pacific Calliaster childreni and Calliaster elegans in having a relatively flattened disk with few disk spines.

== Description ==
The species has a flat, stellate body with broad-based, triangular arms that have pointed tips. A dark to black outline is present around the periphery of the abactinal and marginal plates. Abactinal plates are flattened, with spines present only on the proximalmost radial plates and primary circlet. The arm is composed of approximately 3 to 6 fully or partially abutted superomarginal plates beginning about halfway along the arm's length. Superomarginal plates are quadrate in shape and flattened; there are 14 per arm side (28 per interradius). They bear 2 to 4 conical pointed spines on the proximalmost plates, with identical spines present in series along the dorsolateral angle. The actinal area is composed of 1 or 2 incomplete series, limited to the disk region. Furrow spines number 7 to 10, are slender and pointed, and are arranged in a stellate pattern. Subambulacral spines number 2, then 1 distally, and are prominent, thick, with blunt but pointed tips.

== Distribution and habitat ==
This species is known from off New Caledonia at depths of 150 to 282 meters.
