= List of Zethus species =

This is a list of Zethus species.

- Zethus adonis
- Zethus aethiopicus
- Zethus ajax
- Zethus alacris
- Zethus albopictus
- Zethus albopilosus
- Zethus alogus
- Zethus alticola
- Zethus alvarengai
- Zethus amazonicus
- Zethus analis
- Zethus andesae
- Zethus andinus
- Zethus angustior
- Zethus anisitsii
- Zethus anomalus
- Zethus apicalipennis
- Zethus arabicus
- Zethus arietis
- Zethus arotus
- Zethus ater
- Zethus atripennis
- Zethus attenuatus
- Zethus aurantiacus
- Zethus aurulens
- Zethus aztecus
- Zethus bahamensis
- Zethus bakeri
- Zethus bardus
- Zethus bequaerti
- Zethus bicolor
- Zethus biglumis
- Zethus bilaminatus
- Zethus binghami
- Zethus binodis
- Zethus bodkini
- Zethus boharti
- Zethus bolivarensis
- Zethus bolivianus
- Zethus brasiliensis
- Zethus brooksi
- Zethus bryanti
- Zethus buyssoni
- Zethus campanulatus
- Zethus campestris
- Zethus caracis
- Zethus carbonarius
- Zethus caridei
- Zethus carinatus
- Zethus carpenteri
- Zethus cavagnaroi
- Zethus cavagneroi
- Zethus celebensis
- Zethus cerceroides
- Zethus ceylonicus
- Zethus chacoensis
- Zethus chalybeus
- Zethus chapadensis
- Zethus charon
- Zethus chicotencatl
- Zethus chimorum
- Zethus chrysopterus
- Zethus cineraceus
- Zethus cinerascens
- Zethus claripennis
- Zethus clavatus
- Zethus clio
- Zethus clypearis
- Zethus clypeolaris
- Zethus coeruleopennis
- Zethus coloratus
- Zethus columbiae
- Zethus conicus
- Zethus corallinus
- Zethus corcovadensis
- Zethus coriarius
- Zethus corioicae
- Zethus cristatus
- Zethus cruzi
- Zethus cubensis
- Zethus curialis
- Zethus cylindricus
- Zethus delagoensis
- Zethus demissus
- Zethus dentostipes
- Zethus dicomboda
- Zethus didymogaster
- Zethus diminutus
- Zethus discoelioides
- Zethus dodgei
- Zethus dolosus
- Zethus dreisbachi
- Zethus dubius
- Zethus duckei
- Zethus ebenus
- Zethus ecuadorae
- Zethus emarginatus
- Zethus empeyi
- Zethus erythrogaster
- Zethus erythrostomus
- Zethus evansi
- Zethus excavatus
- Zethus fabricator
- Zethus favilaceus
- Zethus favillaceus
- Zethus felix
- Zethus fergusoni
- Zethus flavidulus
- Zethus flavipons
- Zethus fluminensis
- Zethus fortistriolatus
- Zethus fraternus
- Zethus frederickorum
- Zethus fritzi
- Zethus fulvohirtus
- Zethus fuscus
- Zethus garciai
- Zethus gaudens
- Zethus gigas
- Zethus gonostylus
- Zethus gracilis
- Zethus guatemotzin
- Zethus guerreroi
- Zethus guineensis
- Zethus haemorrhoidalis
- Zethus hamatus
- Zethus harlequinus
- Zethus haywardi
- Zethus hexagonus
- Zethus heydeni
- Zethus hilarianus
- Zethus histrionicus
- Zethus holmbergii
- Zethus huascari
- Zethus iheringi
- Zethus imitator
- Zethus imperfectus
- Zethus improcerus
- Zethus inca
- Zethus incommodus
- Zethus inconstans
- Zethus indicus
- Zethus indistictus
- Zethus inermis
- Zethus infelix
- Zethus infundibuliformis
- Zethus inornatus
- Zethus intermedius
- Zethus irwini
- Zethus islandicus
- Zethus isthmicus
- Zethus javanus
- Zethus jurinei
- Zethus laevinodus
- Zethus lamellicornis
- Zethus lignicola
- Zethus lobulatus
- Zethus longistylus
- Zethus lopezi
- Zethus luederwaldti
- Zethus lunaris
- Zethus lunaris cooperi
- Zethus luzonensis
- Zethus lynchi
- Zethus madecassus
- Zethus magnus
- Zethus magretti
- Zethus malabaricus
- Zethus mandibularis
- Zethus mapiriensis
- Zethus matzicatzin
- Zethus medius
- Zethus melanis
- Zethus menkei
- Zethus mexicanus
- Zethus micella
- Zethus milleri
- Zethus mimus
- Zethus miniatus
- Zethus minimus
- Zethus miscogaster
- Zethus missionus
- Zethus mocsaryi
- Zethus montezuma
- Zethus mutatus
- Zethus namibicus
- Zethus neffi
- Zethus neotomitus
- Zethus nicaraguensis
- Zethus niger
- Zethus nigerrimus
- Zethus nigricornis
- Zethus nitidinodus
- Zethus nodosus
- Zethus notatus
- Zethus nutans
- Zethus oaxacae
- Zethus obscurus
- Zethus olmecus
- Zethus orans
- Zethus orizabae
- Zethus otomitus
- Zethus pallidus
- Zethus pamparum
- Zethus pampicola
- Zethus paranensis
- Zethus parkeri
- Zethus parvulus
- Zethus pavidus
- Zethus peculiaris
- Zethus permutatus
- Zethus peruvianus
- Zethus peruvicus
- Zethus pilosus
- Zethus pipiens
- Zethus placidus
- Zethus planiclypeus
- Zethus plaumanni
- Zethus poeyi
- Zethus polybioides
- Zethus porteri
- Zethus precans
- Zethus productus
- Zethus prominens
- Zethus pronatus
- Zethus proximus
- Zethus pseudozethus
- Zethus pubescens
- Zethus punctatus
- Zethus punctinodis
- Zethus pygmaeus
- Zethus pyriformis
- Zethus quadridentatus
- Zethus restrepoicus
- Zethus rhodesianus
- Zethus rodhaini
- Zethus romandinus
- Zethus roridus
- Zethus rossi
- Zethus rothschildanus
- Zethus rubellus
- Zethus rubioi
- Zethus rufinodus
- Zethus rufipes
- Zethus rufus
- Zethus rugosiceps
- Zethus satanicus
- Zethus schadei
- Zethus schlingeri
- Zethus schrottkyanus
- Zethus sculpturalis
- Zethus senegalensis
- Zethus sessilis
- Zethus seyrigi
- Zethus shannoni
- Zethus sichelianus
- Zethus silvaegrandis
- Zethus silvestris
- Zethus simillimus
- Zethus simulans
- Zethus slossonae
- Zethus smidtianus
- Zethus smithii
- Zethus soikai
- Zethus spegazzinii
- Zethus spinipes
- Zethus spiniventris
- Zethus spinosus
- Zethus stellaris
- Zethus striatifrons
- Zethus strigosus
- Zethus subspinosus
- Zethus sulcatus
- Zethus thoracicus
- Zethus toltecus
- Zethus torquatus
- Zethus trimaculatus
- Zethus trispinosus
- Zethus tuberculifer
- Zethus umbrosus
- Zethus varipunctatus
- Zethus velezi
- Zethus venezuelanus
- Zethus ventricosus
- Zethus vincenti
- Zethus wagneri
- Zethus waldoi
- Zethus westwoodi
- Zethus weyrauchi
- Zethus wileyi
- Zethus willinki
- Zethus yarrowi
- Zethus yepezi
- Zethus yucatanae
- Zethus yucatanensis
- Zethus zendalus
