= Callister =

Callister is a surname and a given name. Notable people with the name include:

Surname:

- Charles Warren Callister (1917–2008), American architect based in Tiburon, California
- Cyril Callister (1893–1949), Australian chemist and food technologist who developed the Vegemite yeast spread
- David Callister, MLC (1935–2020), Manx politician and broadcaster, who was a member of the Legislative Council of the Isle of Man
- E. R. Callister Jr. (1916–1980), American lawyer and politician
- Kent Callister (born 1995), Australian snowboarder
- Marion Jones Callister (1921–1997), American attorney and jurist in the District of Idaho
- Rob Callister, Manx politician
- T. Brian Callister, American physician who works on care transitions
- Tad R. Callister (1945–2025), American Mormon leader
- Valerie Callister (born 1950), former Australian politician
- William Callister MHK (1808–1872), timber importer from Ramsey who became a Member of the House of Keys

Given name:

- Janette Callister Hales Beckham (1933–2022), general president of the Young Women organization of the Church of Jesus Christ of Latter-day Saints
- Thomas Callister Hales (born 1958), American mathematician working in representation theory, discrete geometry, and formal verification

== See also ==
- Callister Park, sports facility in East Vancouver, Canada
- USS Callister, an episode of Black Mirror
- Calliaster, a genus of starfish
- Calligaster, a species of wasp
- McCallister, a surname
