= Macrocalymma =

Scientific classification
- Kingdom: Animalia
- Phylum: Arthropoda
- Clade: Pancrustacea
- Class: Insecta
- Order: Hymenoptera
- Family: Vespidae
- Subfamily: Zethinae
- Genus: Macrocalymma; Perkins, 1908

Type species
- Macrocalymma smithianum Perkins, 1908

Species
- Macrocalymma aliciae Meade-Waldo, 1914; Macrocalymma smithianum Perkins, 1908

Genus of wasps

Macrocalymma is an Australian genus of potter wasps.
