= Zethus carpenteri =

Scientific classification
- Kingdom: Animalia
- Phylum: Arthropoda
- Clade: Pancrustacea
- Class: Insecta
- Order: Hymenoptera
- Family: Vespidae
- Genus: Zethus
- Species: Z. carpenteri

Binomial name
- Zethus carpenteri Stange, 1997

Species of wasp

Zethus carpenteri is a potter wasp in the family Vespidae, subfamily Zethinae native to Venezuela.
