= Ischnocoelia =

Scientific classification
- Kingdom: Animalia
- Phylum: Arthropoda
- Clade: Pancrustacea
- Class: Insecta
- Order: Hymenoptera
- Family: Vespidae
- Subfamily: Zethinae
- Genus: Ischnocoelia; Perkins, 1908

Type species
- Ischnocoelia xanthochroma Perkins, 1908

Genus of wasps

Ischnocoelia is an Australian genus of potter wasps. The species currently recognised under this genus are:

- Ischnocoelia chlorotica Giordani Soika, 1993
- Ischnocoelia elongata (Saussure, 1856)
- Ischnocoelia exigua Borsato, 2003
- Ischnocoelia ferruginea (Meade-Waldo, 1910) [see note]
- Ischnocoelia fulva (Schulthess, 1910)
- Ischnocoelia gregoryensis Borsato, 2003
- Ischnocoelia integra (Schulthess, 1910)
- Ischnocoelia mirabile Borsato, 2003
- Ischnocoelia occidentalis Giordani Soika, 1969
- Ischnocoelia polychroma Giordani Soika, 1969
- Ischnocoelia robusta (Meade-Waldo, 1910)
- Ischnocoelia somniata Borsato, 2003 [contra apparent misspelling as "somniara"]
- Ischnocoelia xanthochroma Perkins, 1908
- Ischnocoelia yahwulpa Borsato, 2003

Note: Ischnocoelia ferruginea (Meade-Waldo, 1910) can include Ischnocoelia ecclesiastica (Rayment, 1954) as a subjective junior synonym per Borsato 2003:517. Else treated as recombined in genus Zethus, see replacement name Zethus rutilus Lopes, 2021 due to homonym.
