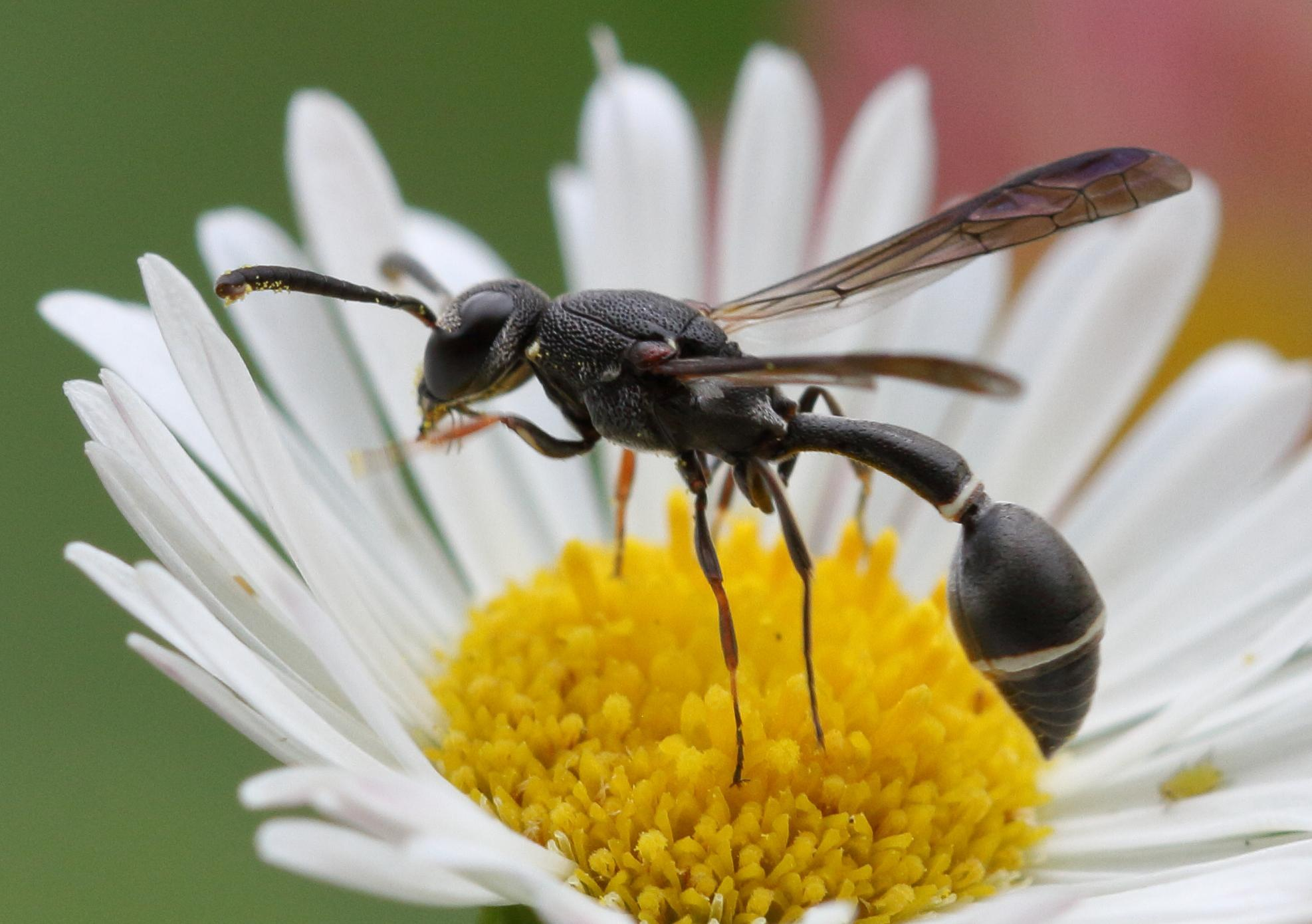
- A potter wasp, Micreumenes sp. visiting a flower of Erigeron karvinskianus (Mexican Fleabane). Chase Valley Heights, Pietermaritzburg, South Africa

Scientific classification
- Kingdom: Animalia
- Phylum: Arthropoda
- Clade: Pancrustacea
- Class: Insecta
- Order: Hymenoptera
- Family: Vespidae
- Subfamily: Eumeninae
- Genus: Micreumenes; Ashmead, 1902

Type species
- Micreumenes currei Ashmead, 1902

Species
- see text

= Micreumenes =

Genus of wasps

Micreumenes is an Afrotropical genus of potter wasps with 30 described species.

== Species ==
- Micreumenes adelphus (Meade-Waldo, 1911)
- Micreumenes annulipes (Cameron, 1910)
- Micreumenes aterrimus (Giordani Soika, 1944)
- Micreumenes basilewskyi (Giordani Soika, 1955)
- Micreumenes brevicornis Gusenleitner, 2005
- Micreumenes clypeolaris Giordani Soika, 1983
- Micreumenes crassipunctatus Gusenleitner, 2000
- Micreumenes curriei Ashmead, 1902
- Micreumenes glaber Giordani Soika, 1983
- Micreumenes guillarmodi Giordani Soika, 1983
- Micreumenes kelneri Giordani Soika, 1983
- Micreumenes kenyaensis Gusenleitner, 2000
- Micreumenes marci Gusenleitner, 2000
- Micreumenes microspinae Gusenleitner, 2000
- Micreumenes mozambicanus (Giordani Soika, 1944)
- Micreumenes mutarensis Gusenleitner, 2002
- Micreumenes natalensis (de Saussure, 1855)
- Micreumenes nigerrimus Gusenleitner, 2000
- Micreumenes nigrorufus Giordani Soika, 1989
- Micreumenes notabilis Giordani Soika, 1983
- Micreumenes obscurus Gusenleitner, 2000
- Micreumenes perversus Giordani Soika, 1989
- Micreumenes petri Gusenleitner, 2000
- Micreumenes ruficlypeus Gusenleitner, 1998
- Micreumenes rufipes (Cameron, 1905)
- Micreumenes separandus Gusenleitner, 2002
- Micreumenes snellingi Gusenleitner, 2002
- Micreumenes subtilis Gusenleitner, 2007
- Micreumenes voiensis Gusenleitner, 2000
