= Pachycoelius =

Scientific classification
- Kingdom: Animalia
- Phylum: Arthropoda
- Clade: Pancrustacea
- Class: Insecta
- Order: Hymenoptera
- Family: Vespidae
- Subfamily: Zethinae
- Genus: Pachycoelius; Giordani Soika, 1969

Type species
- Pachycoelius brevicornis Giordani Soika, 1969

Species
- Pachycoelius brevicornis Giordani Soika, 1969; Pachycoelius carinatus (Meade-Waldo, 1910); Pachycoelius mediocris Giordani Soika, 1969

Genus of wasps

Pachycoelius is an Australian genus of potter wasps.
