= Elimus =

Scientific classification
- Kingdom: Animalia
- Phylum: Arthropoda
- Clade: Pancrustacea
- Class: Insecta
- Order: Hymenoptera
- Family: Vespidae
- Subfamily: Zethinae
- Genus: Elimus; Saussure, 1852

Species
- See text

Genus of wasps

Elimus is an Australian genus of potter wasps. It contains the following species:

- Elimus arabicus Meade-Waldo, 1910
- Elimus australis Saussure, 1852
- Elimus mackayensis Meade-Waldo, 1910
- Elimus papuanus Borsato & Giordani Soika, 1995
