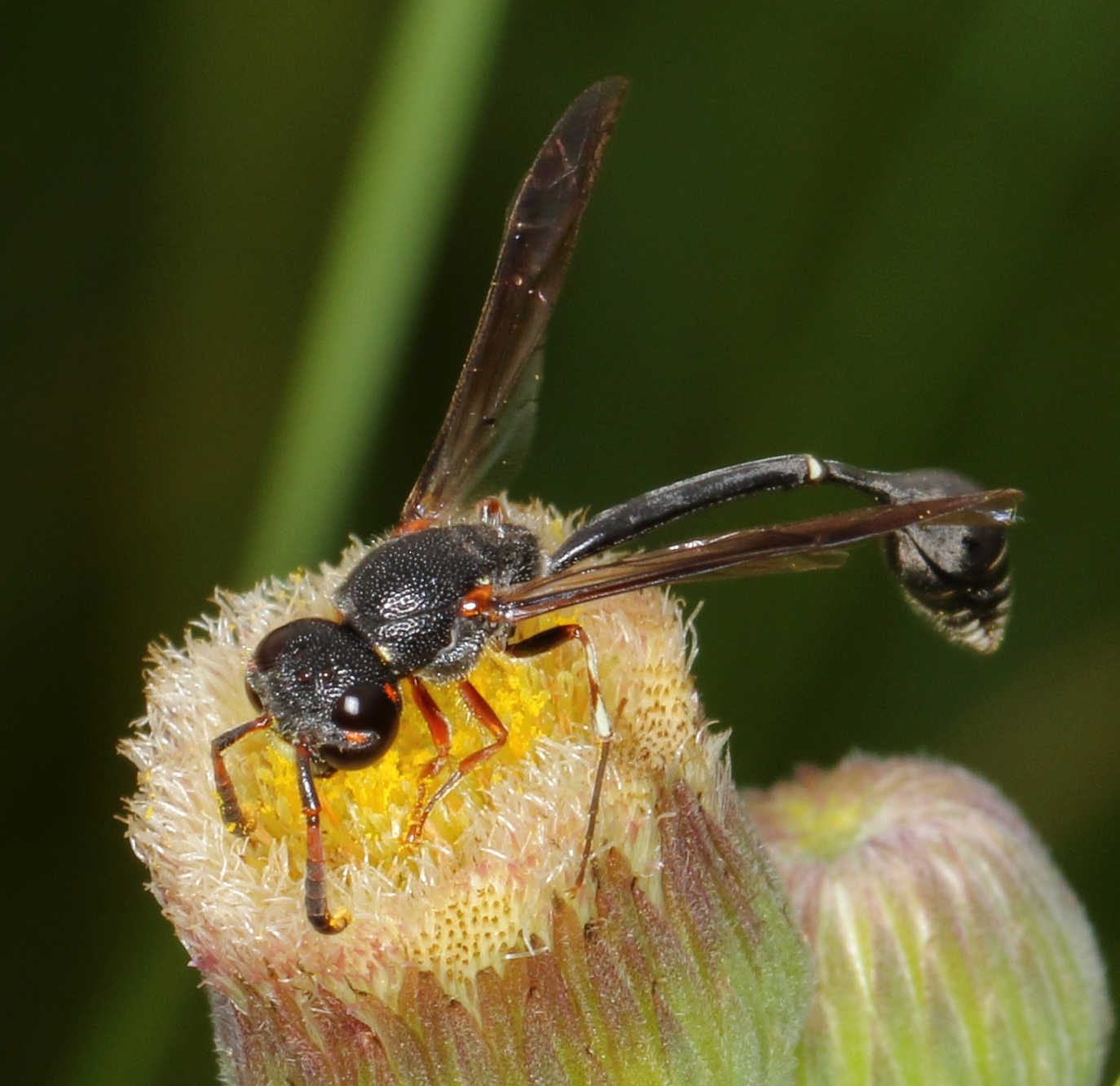
- Paramischocyttarus buyssoni

Scientific classification
- Kingdom: Animalia
- Phylum: Arthropoda
- Clade: Pancrustacea
- Class: Insecta
- Order: Hymenoptera
- Family: Vespidae
- Subfamily: Zethinae
- Genus: Paramischocyttarus; Magretti, 1884

Type species
- Paramischocyttarus subtilis Magretti, 1884

Species
- See text

= Paramischocyttarus =

Genus of wasps

Paramischocyttarus is a small afrotropical and palearctic Zethus-like genus of potter wasps.

== Species ==
The following species are classified as belonging to Paramischocyttarus:

- Paramischocyttarus buyssoni (Gribodo, 1896)
- Paramischocyttarus guichardi Giordani Soika, 1987
- Paramischocyttarus lacuum Stadelmann, 1898
- Paramischocyttarus subtilis Magretti, 1884
