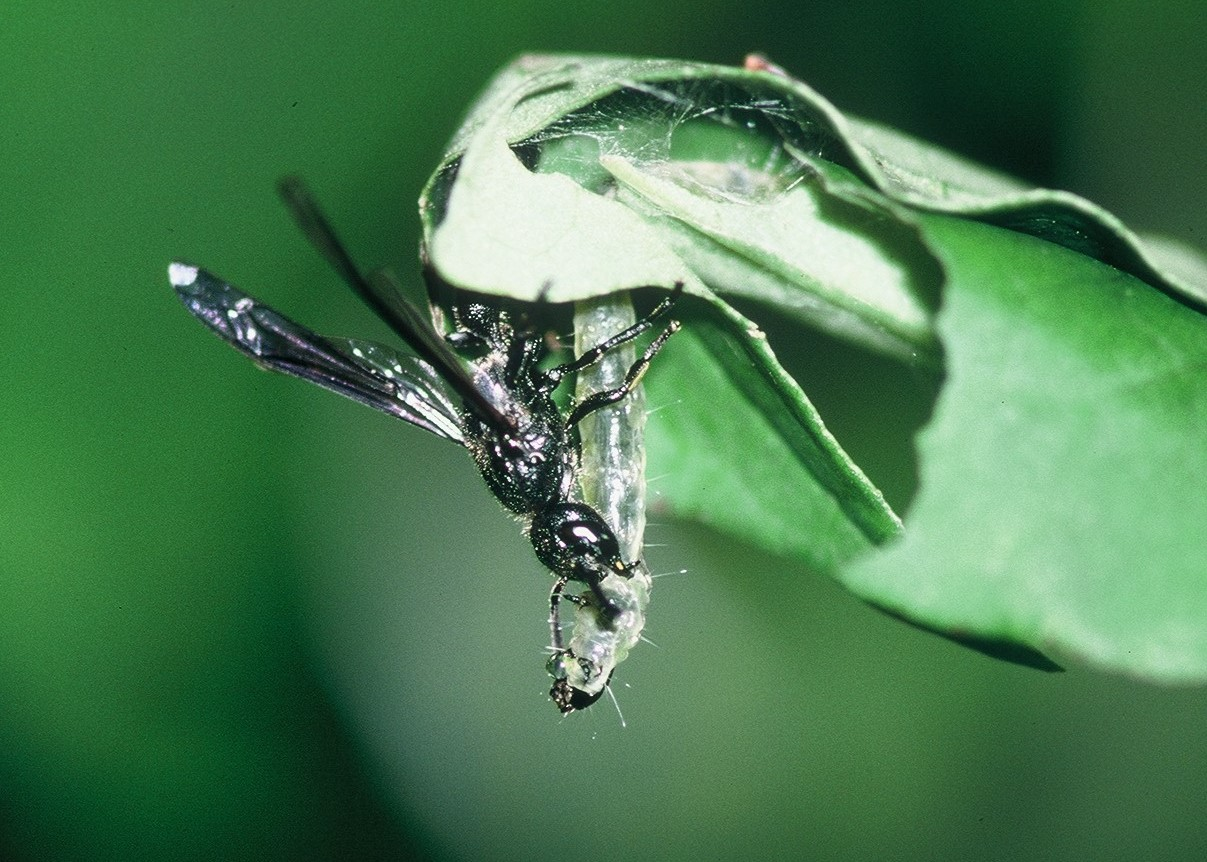
- Discoelius zonalis

Scientific classification
- Kingdom: Animalia
- Phylum: Arthropoda
- Clade: Pancrustacea
- Class: Insecta
- Order: Hymenoptera
- Family: Vespidae
- Subfamily: Zethinae
- Genus: Discoelius; Latreille, 1809

Species
- See text

= Discoelius =

Genus of wasps

Discoelius is a palearctic genus of potter wasps with seven currently known species. It contains the following species:

- Discoelius albonotatus Brèthes, 1906
- Discoelius argentines Brèthes, 1905
- Discoelius assimilis Brèthes, 1903
- Discoelius auritulus Brèthes], 1903
- Discoelius cuyanus Brèthes, 1903
- Discoelius dimidiatus Ducke, 1904
- Discoelius dufourii Lepeletier, 1841
- Discoelius emeishanensus Zhou & Li, 2013
- Discoelius esakii Yasumatsu, 1934
- Discoelius longinodus Sk. Yamane, 1997
- Discoelius manchurianus Yasumatsu, 1934
- Discoelius niger Zavattari, 1911
- Discoelius nigriclypeus Zhou & Li, 2013
- Discoelius nitidus Brethes, 1903
- Discoelius pictus Kostylev, 1940
- Discoelius planiventris Giordani Soika, 1971
- Discoelius turneri (Meade-Waldo, 1910)
- Discoelius wangi Sk. Yamane, 1990
- Discoelius zonalis (Panzer 1801)
