= Eudiscoelius =

Scientific classification
- Domain: Eukaryota
- Kingdom: Animalia
- Phylum: Arthropoda
- Class: Insecta
- Order: Hymenoptera
- Family: Vespidae
- Subfamily: Eumeninae
- Genus: Eudiscoelius; Friese, 1904

Genus of wasps

Eudiscoelius is an Australasian genus of potter wasps. They are notable for their strongly metallic green to violet bodies. The following species are among those included in Eudiscoelius:

- Eudiscoelius bismarcki Giordani Soika, 1995
- Eudiscoelius elegans (Smith, 1861)
- Eudiscoelius elegantulus (Dalla Torre, 1894)
- Eudiscoelius ferrugineipes Giordani Soika, 1995
- Eudiscoelius gilberti (Turner, 1908)
- Eudiscoelius lucens Giordani Soika, 1995
- Eudiscoelius pulcherrimus Giordani Soika, 1995
- Eudiscoelius rechbergi (Meade-Waldo, 1910)
- Eudiscoelius saussurei (Kirsch, 1878)
- Eudiscoelius solomon Giordani Soika, 1995
- Eudiscoelius violaceus (Schulthess, 1903)
- Eudiscoelius viridipes (Cameron, 1911)
- Eudiscoelius viridis (Smith, 1858)
