= Ovodynerus =

Scientific classification
- Kingdom: Animalia
- Phylum: Arthropoda
- Class: Insecta
- Order: Hymenoptera
- Family: Vespidae
- Subfamily: Eumeninae
- Genus: Ovodynerus; Giordani Soika, 1985

Type species
- Ovodynerus capicola (Meade-Waldo), 1915

Genus of wasps

Ovodynerus is an Afrotropical genus of potter wasps which contains eleven species.

Potter wasps are solitary builders of 'flask-shaped' nests of mud, each containing an egg and larval food supply.

== Species ==
The following species are classified as belonging to the genus Ovodynerus:

- Ovodynerus ashtonensis Gusenleitner, 2005
- Ovodynerus capicola (Meade-Waldo, 1915)
- Ovodynerus chapini (Bequaert, 1918)
- Ovodynerus ferrugineimaculatus Giordani Soika, 1985
- Ovodynerus humeralis Giordani Soika, 1989
- Ovodynerus kabarensis (Bequaert, 1918)
- Ovodynerus leviclypeus Gusenleitner, 1999
- Ovodynerus sjoestedti (Cameron, 1910)
- Ovodynerus tricoloratus Gusenleitner, 2003
- Ovodynerus willowmorensis Giordani Soika, 1985
- Ovodynerus yngvei (Cameron, 1910)
