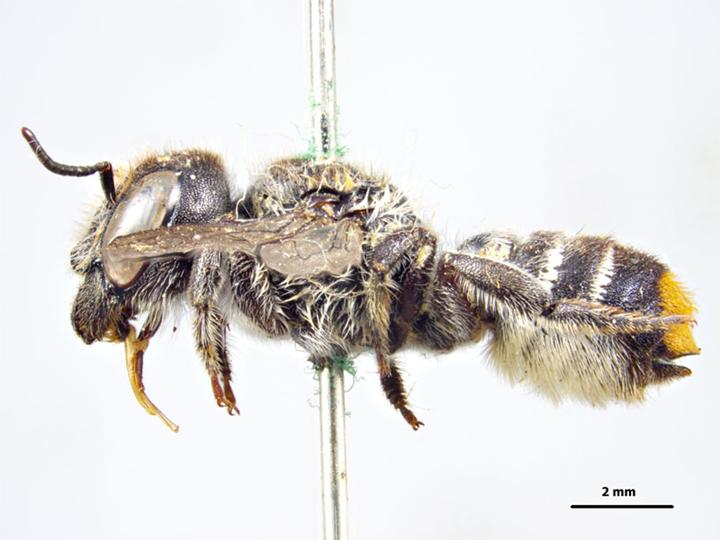

Scientific classification
- Kingdom: Animalia
- Phylum: Arthropoda
- Clade: Pancrustacea
- Class: Insecta
- Order: Hymenoptera
- Family: Megachilidae
- Genus: Megachile
- Species: M. speluncarum

Binomial name
- Megachile speluncarum Meade-Waldo, 1915

= Megachile speluncarum =

Species of leafcutter bee

Megachile speluncarum is a species of bee in the family Megachilidae. It was described by Meade-Waldo in 1915.
