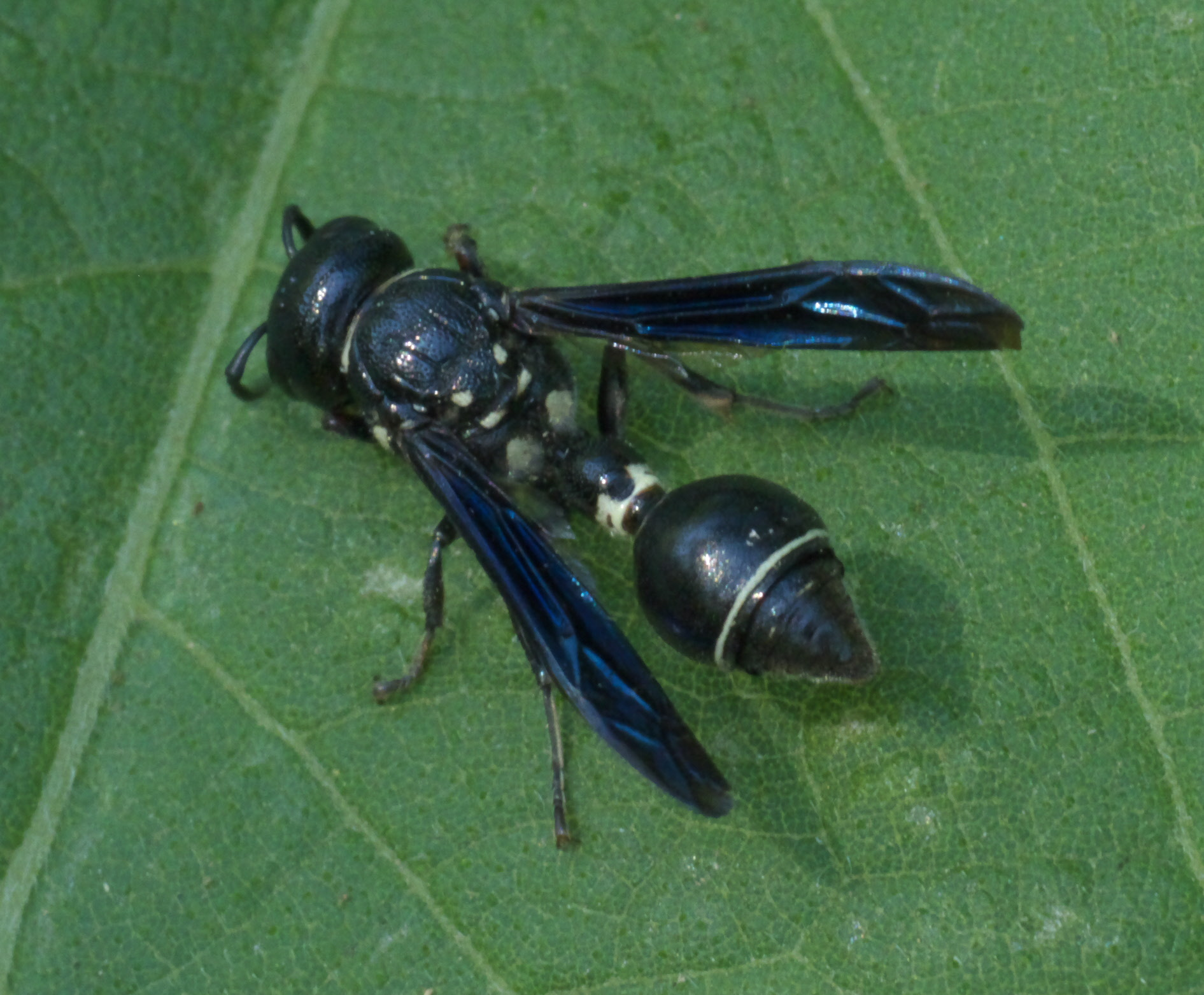
- Zethus spinipes

Scientific classification
- Kingdom: Animalia
- Phylum: Arthropoda
- Clade: Pancrustacea
- Class: Insecta
- Order: Hymenoptera
- Family: Vespidae
- Subfamily: Zethinae

Genera
- 16 genera (see text)

= Zethinae =

Subfamily of wasps

The Zethinae are a subfamily of wasps in the family Vespidae, the members of which are referred to as potter wasps owing to their method of nest construction.

== Taxonomy ==
Zethines were formerly included in the subfamily Eumeninae, also known as potter wasps, as the tribe Zethini until it was recognized that the zethine lineage rendered Eumeninae paraphyletic.

== Genera ==
- Argentozethus Stange, 1979
- Australozethus Giordani Soika, 1969
- Calligaster de Saussure, 1852
- Ctenochilus de Saussure 1856
- Deuterodiscoelius Dalla Torre, 1904
- Discoelius Latreille, 1809
- Elimus de Saussure, 1852
- Ischnocoelia Perkins, 1908
- Macrocalymma Perkins, 1908
- Pachycoelius Giordani Soika, 1969
- Paramischocyttarus Magretti, 1884
- Protodiscoelius Dalla Torre, 1904
- Psiliglossa Saunders, 1872
- Raphiglossa Saunders, 1850
- Zetheumenidion Bequaert, 1926
- Zethus Fabricius, 1804
