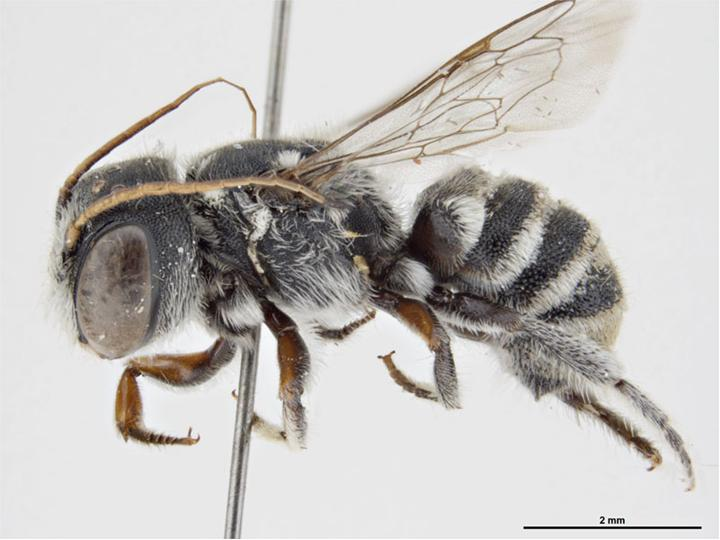

Scientific classification
- Kingdom: Animalia
- Phylum: Arthropoda
- Class: Insecta
- Order: Hymenoptera
- Family: Megachilidae
- Genus: Megachile
- Species: M. turneri

Binomial name
- Megachile turneri (Meade-Waldo, 1913)

= Megachile turneri =

Species of leafcutter bee (Megachile)

Megachile turneri is a species of bee in the family Megachilidae. It was described by Meade-Waldo in 1913.
