= Psiliglossa =

Scientific classification
- Kingdom: Animalia
- Phylum: Arthropoda
- Clade: Pancrustacea
- Class: Insecta
- Order: Hymenoptera
- Family: Vespidae
- Subfamily: Zethinae
- Genus: Psiliglossa; Saunders, 1872

Type species
- Psiliglossa odyneroides (Saunders, 1850)

Species
- Psiliglossa algeriensis Saunders, 1905; Psiliglossa anatolica Giordani Soika, 1979; Psiliglossa odyneroides (Saunders, 1850); Psiliglossa kozhantshikovi Kostylev, 1940; Psiliglossa pulchra Morawitz, 1895; Psiliglossa zeppelini Dusmet, 1917; Psiliglossa zhelochortsevi Panfilov, 1968

Genus of wasps

Psiliglossa is a circum-Mediterranean and Central-Asian genus of potter wasps with seven known species.
