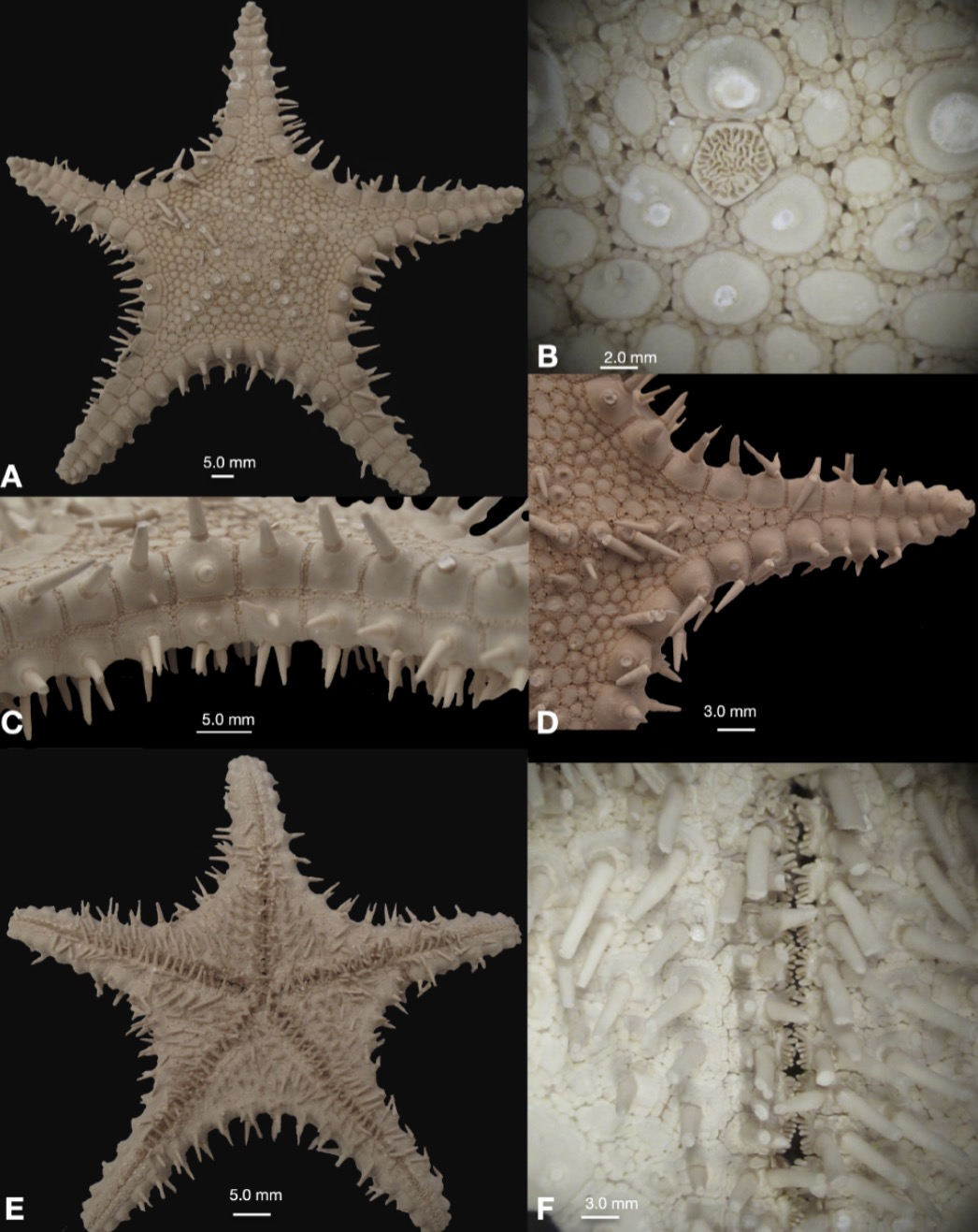

Scientific classification
- Kingdom: Animalia
- Phylum: Echinodermata
- Class: Asteroidea
- Order: Valvatida
- Family: Goniasteridae
- Genus: Calliaster
- Species: C. aquamontis

Binomial name
- Calliaster aquamontis Mah, 2026

= Calliaster aquamontis =

Species of sea star

Calliaster aquamontis is a species of sea star in the family Goniasteridae found in New Caledonia.

== Etymology ==
The species epithet aquamontis is derived from Latin for "water mountain".

== Taxonomy and systematics ==
Specimens of this species were previously misidentified as Milteliphaster wanganellensis. It is distinguished from the New Zealand species Calliaster wanganellensis by having significantly fewer superomarginal and inferomarginal spines (1 or 2 from a single point versus 2 different series), fewer abactinal spines on the disk and arms, an indistinct carinal plate series, and distalmost abutting supermarginal plates (absent in C. wanganellensis). It also shares some similarities with Calliaster spinosus from southern Australian waters, such as similar numbers of furrow spines (7–8), but differs by having indiscrete carinal plates, abutted superomarginal plates 2–5 pairs from the arm tip, and larger marginal plates (19–30 per interradius at R=7.8 cm vs. 50–52 in C. spinosus at R=14.0 cm). It shows resemblance to the Indian Ocean species Calliaster chaos, sharing abactinal spines predominantly on the disk and abutted superomarginal plates distally, but differs by having fewer furrow spines (6–7 vs. 9–10 in C. chaos) and a less dense arrangement of abactinal spines.

== Description ==
The species has a stellate body with an arm length to disk radius ratio of 2.4 to 3.2 and short, triangular arms. Spines are present on proximal disk plates and in each interradii but are absent from distal plates adjacent to the superomarginal contact. There are 19–30 superomarginal plates per interradius (arm tip to arm tip), forming approximately 14–15% of the disk diameter. Superomarginals possess two series of prominent, conical, pointed spines. Each actinal plate bears a large, prominent single spine, with the plate surface otherwise bare and smooth; approximately 25% of these plates also have a paddle-shaped pedicellaria adjacent to the spine. Furrow spines number 6 to 7. Subambulacral spines number two, with variably conical blunt or flattened, chisel-like tips.

== Distribution and habitat ==
This species is known from seamounts off New Caledonia at depths of 425 to 540 meters.
