= Australozethus =

Scientific classification
- Kingdom: Animalia
- Phylum: Arthropoda
- Clade: Pancrustacea
- Class: Insecta
- Order: Hymenoptera
- Family: Vespidae
- Subfamily: Zethinae
- Genus: Australozethus; Giordani Soika, 1969

Species
- Australozethus continentalis; Australozethus occidentalis; Australozethus tasmaniensis

Genus of wasps

Australozethus is an Australasian genus of potter wasps.
