= Calliaster kanak =

Scientific classification
- Kingdom: Animalia
- Phylum: Echinodermata
- Class: Asteroidea
- Order: Valvatida
- Family: Goniasteridae
- Genus: Calliaster
- Species: C. kanak

Binomial name
- Calliaster kanak Mah, 2026

Species of sea star

Calliaster kanak is a species of sea star in the family Goniasteridae found off New Caledonia and New Zealand.

== Etymology ==
The species epithet kanak honors the Kanak, the native people of New Caledonia.

== Taxonomy and systematics ==
This species was previously misidentified as Calliaster erucaradiatus from New Zealand and later as Calliaster elegans. It is distinguished from C. erucaradiatus by its marginal spines being in an irregular arrangement, having only one spine on all superomarginal plates, having strongly convex superomarginal plates, and possessing 5 to 6 furrow spines. It is distinguished from C. elegans primarily by the presence of a single, irregularly arranged and prominent, pointed spine on both superomarginal and inferomarginal series, whereas C. elegans has 3 to 4 pointed spines on inferomarginal plates and relatively short conical spines on the superomarginal plate surface, both in series.

== Description ==
The species has a stellate to strongly stellate body with pointed, elongate arms. Abactinal plates on the disk, carinal series, and most interradial regions have distinctly produced bases bearing conical spines. Abactinal plates are limited to the disk, with none on the arms where the superomarginals are abutted. Superomarginal plates, approximately 8 to 10 along the arm side (16 to 20 per interradius), are abutted across most of the arm; their surfaces are smooth, highly tumid, and bear a single, irregularly directed elongate spine. The actinal surface is relatively small, with approximately 2 to 3 plate series primarily isolated to the disk; all actinal plates bear a single spine. Furrow spines number 5 to 6, are blunt-tipped, and are arranged in a straight series. Subambulacral spines number two, are thick, elongate, and blunt, arranged in a transverse series.

== Distribution and habitat ==
This species is known from off New Caledonia at depths of 180–470 meters and from the Taupo Seamount off New Zealand at 90–153 meters.
