= Ctenochilus =

Scientific classification
- Kingdom: Animalia
- Phylum: Arthropoda
- Clade: Pancrustacea
- Class: Insecta
- Order: Hymenoptera
- Family: Vespidae
- Subfamily: Zethinae
- Genus: Ctenochilus; Saussure 1856

Species
- Ctenochilus argentinus Brethes, 1903; Ctenochilus bimaculatus (Zavattari, 1912); Ctenochilus chilensis Giordani Soika, 1962; Ctenochilus cuyanus (Brethes, 1903); Ctenochilus pilipalpus (Spinola, 1851)

Genus of wasps

Ctenochilus is a small south Andean and Patagonian genus of potter wasps.
