= Zetheumenidion =

Scientific classification
- Kingdom: Animalia
- Phylum: Arthropoda
- Clade: Pancrustacea
- Class: Insecta
- Order: Hymenoptera
- Family: Vespidae
- Subfamily: Zethinae
- Genus: Zetheumenidion; Bequaert, 1926

Type species
- Zetheumenidion femoratum (Schultess, 1910)

Genus of wasps

Zetheumenidion is a small afrotropical genus of potter wasps currently containing 11 species, one of them previously with two subspecies. The species are distributed through southern and eastern Africa.

- Zetheumenidion abruptum Selis, 2024
- Zetheumenidion celonitiforme (Giordani Soika, 1944)
- Zetheumenidion concinnoide Selis, 2024
- Zetheumenidion femoratum (Schulthess, 1910)
- Zetheumenidion flavissimum Giordani Soika & Salt, 1987
- Zetheumenidion hessei (Giordani Soika, 1944)
- Zetheumenidion invertitum (Giordani Soika, 1944)
- Zetheumenidion latum Selis, 2024
- Zetheumenidion minimum Selis, 2024
- Zetheumenidion paeneplanum (Bequaert, 1926)
- Zetheumenidion pulchripenne (Cameron, 1910)
