= Deuterodiscoelius =

Scientific classification
- Kingdom: Animalia
- Phylum: Arthropoda
- Clade: Pancrustacea
- Class: Insecta
- Order: Hymenoptera
- Family: Vespidae
- Subfamily: Zethinae
- Genus: Deuterodiscoelius; Dalla Torre, 1904

Species
- See text

Genus of wasps

Deuterodiscoelius is an Australian genus of potter wasps. It contains the following species:

- Deuterodiscoelius australensis (Perkins, 1914)
- Deuterodiscoelius confuses Giordani Soika, 1969
- Deuterodiscoelius ephippium (Saussure, 1855)
- Deuterodiscoelius insignis (Saussure, 1856)
- Deuterodiscoelius pseudospinosus Giordani Soika, 1969
- Deuterodiscoelius spinosus (Saussure, 1856)
- Deuterodiscoelius verreauxii (Saussure, 1852)
