= Raphiglossa =

Scientific classification
- Kingdom: Animalia
- Phylum: Arthropoda
- Clade: Pancrustacea
- Class: Insecta
- Order: Hymenoptera
- Family: Vespidae
- Subfamily: Zethinae
- Genus: Raphiglossa; Saunders, 1850

Type species
- Raphiglossa eumenoides Saunders, 1850

Species
- Raphiglossa bytinskii Giordani Soika, 1974; Raphiglossa eumenoides Saunders, 1850; Raphiglossa flavoornata (Cameron, 1905); Raphiglossa formosa Kostylev, 1940; Raphiglossa irana Giordani Soika, 1970; Raphiglossa lemuriae Giordani Soika, 1941; Raphiglossa natalensis Smith, 1857; Raphiglossa septentrionalis Giordani Soika, 1989; Raphiglossa spinosa (Fabricius, 1804); Raphiglossa tibestica Giordani Soika, 1974

Genus of wasps

Raphiglossa is an African and Palearctic genus of potter wasps.
