= Calliaster kyros =

Scientific classification
- Kingdom: Animalia
- Phylum: Echinodermata
- Class: Asteroidea
- Order: Valvatida
- Family: Goniasteridae
- Genus: Calliaster
- Species: C. kyros

Binomial name
- Calliaster kyros Mah, 2026

Species of sea star

Calliaster kyros is a species of sea star in the family Goniasteridae found off New Caledonia.

== Etymology ==
The species epithet kyros is derived from the Greek for "lord" or "master".

== Taxonomy and systematics ==
This species is similar to Calliaster hystrix in sharing numerous bivalved pedicellariae on the actinal surface. However, C. kyros is distinguished by the very striking armament present on the abactinal and marginal plates as well as by having abutted superomarginal plates that include over half of the distal paired plates along the arm.

== Description ==
The species has a stellate body with five triangular, elongate, tapering arms with pointed tips. The abactinal surface has distinct, conical, pointed spines on the primary circlet and along the carinal series, and more variably in interradial regions. Superomarginal plates are abutted over the midline, with 10–15 along the arm; abactinal plates are present only on the disk and a triangular region onto the arm prior to the abutted superomarginal plates. Superomarginal plates have two spine series, one series present only on plates in contact with the disk and directed dorsally, and a second series extending along most of the arm and directed laterally. The actinal surface, especially adjacent to the adambulacral series and approximately 50% of actinal intermediate plates, has large bivalve pedicellariae with large round valves bearing rough to teethed edges. Furrow spines number 8 or 9. Subambulacral spines number 2 to 4 and are large and thick.

== Distribution and habitat ==
This species is known from off New Caledonia at depths of 274 to 460 meters.
