= Protodiscoelius =

Scientific classification
- Kingdom: Animalia
- Phylum: Arthropoda
- Clade: Pancrustacea
- Class: Insecta
- Order: Hymenoptera
- Family: Vespidae
- Subfamily: Zethinae
- Genus: Protodiscoelius; Dalla Torre, 1904

Type species
- Protodiscoelius merula (Haliday, 1836)

Species
- Protodiscoelius merula (Haliday, 1836); Protodiscoelius schachovskoyi (Willink, 1957)

Genus of wasps

Protodiscoelius is a small Andean-Patagonian genus of potter wasps which contains two species.
