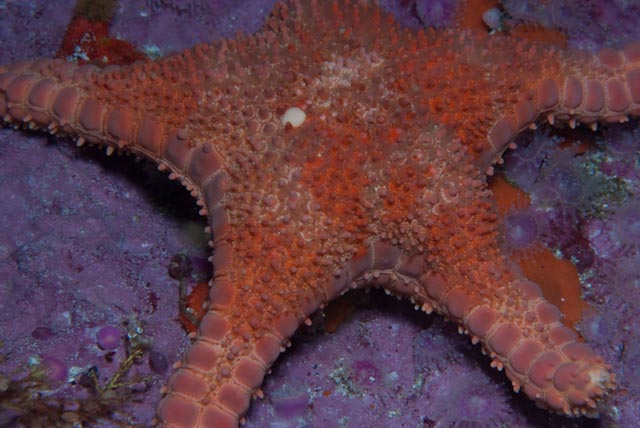

Scientific classification
- Kingdom: Animalia
- Phylum: Echinodermata
- Class: Asteroidea
- Order: Valvatida
- Family: Goniasteridae
- Genus: Calliaster
- Species: C. baccatus

Binomial name
- Calliaster baccatus Sladen, 1889

= Calliaster baccatus =

Species of starfish

Calliaster baccatus, the cobbled starfish, is a species of starfish in the family Goniasteridae.

== Description ==
The cobbled starfish is a large brick-coloured starfish which grows up to 200mm across. Its central area is covered with coarse granules and its upper arms are edged with large squarish tiles which may be smooth or have protruding granules. The tiles on the outer edged of the arms usually have protruding granules.

== Distribution ==
It is only found from Lamberts Bay to Port Elizabeth on the South African coast, in 9-23m. It appears to be endemic to this area.

== Ecology ==
This starfish is found on rocky reefs, mostly along the sandy margins. Its food and reproductive habits are unknown.

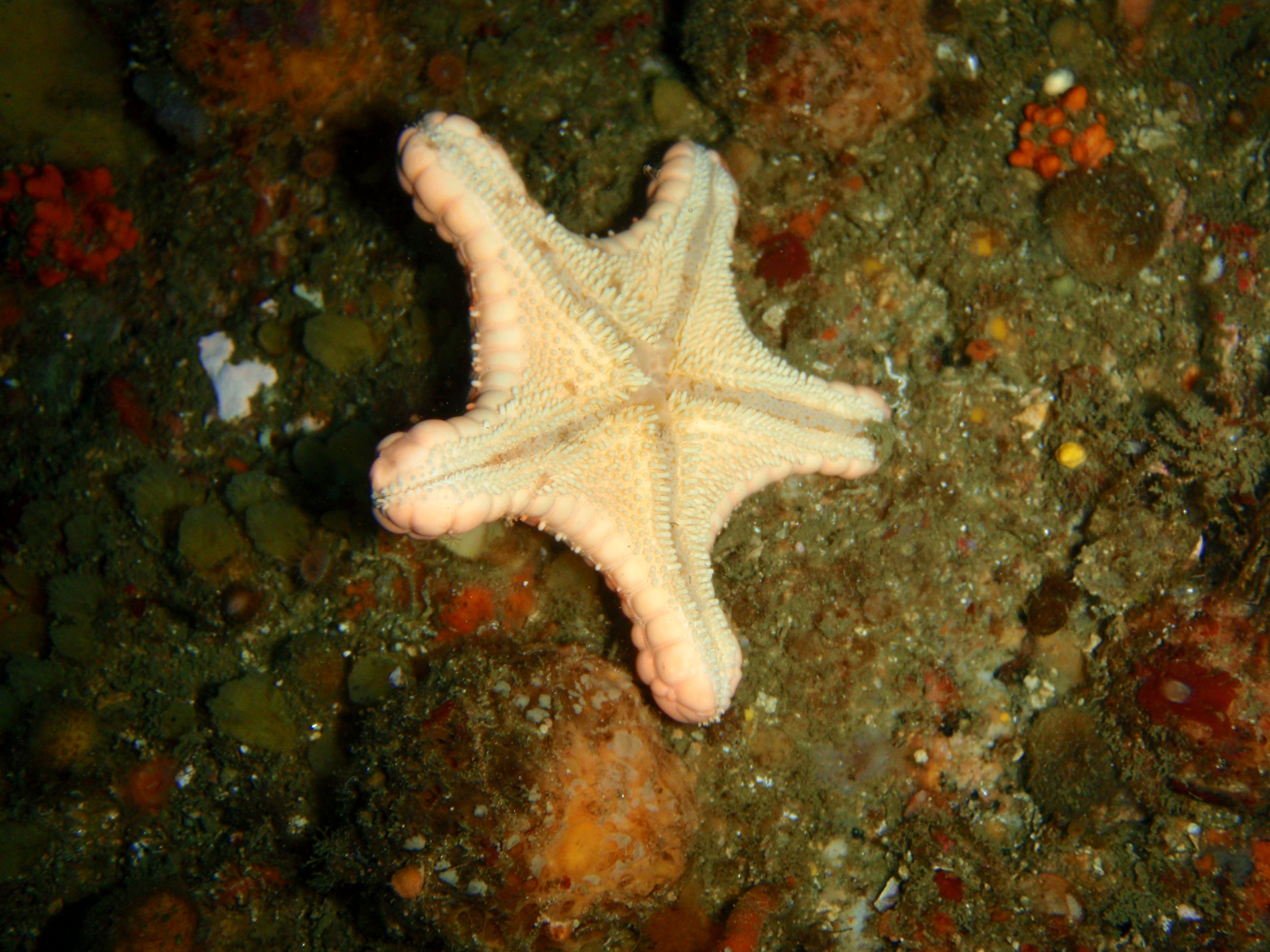
Calliaster baccatus oral surface

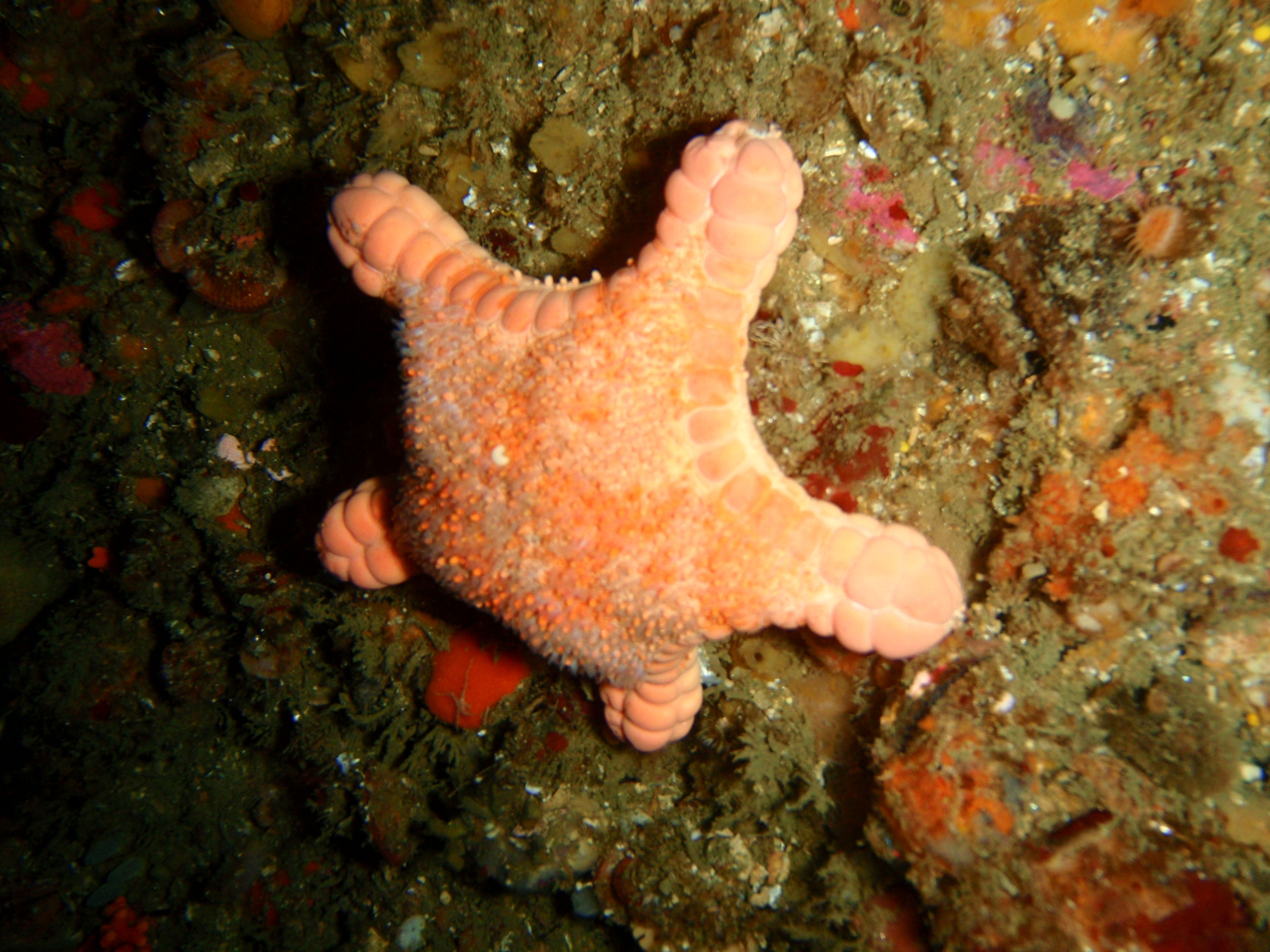
Calliaster baccatus, aboral surface
