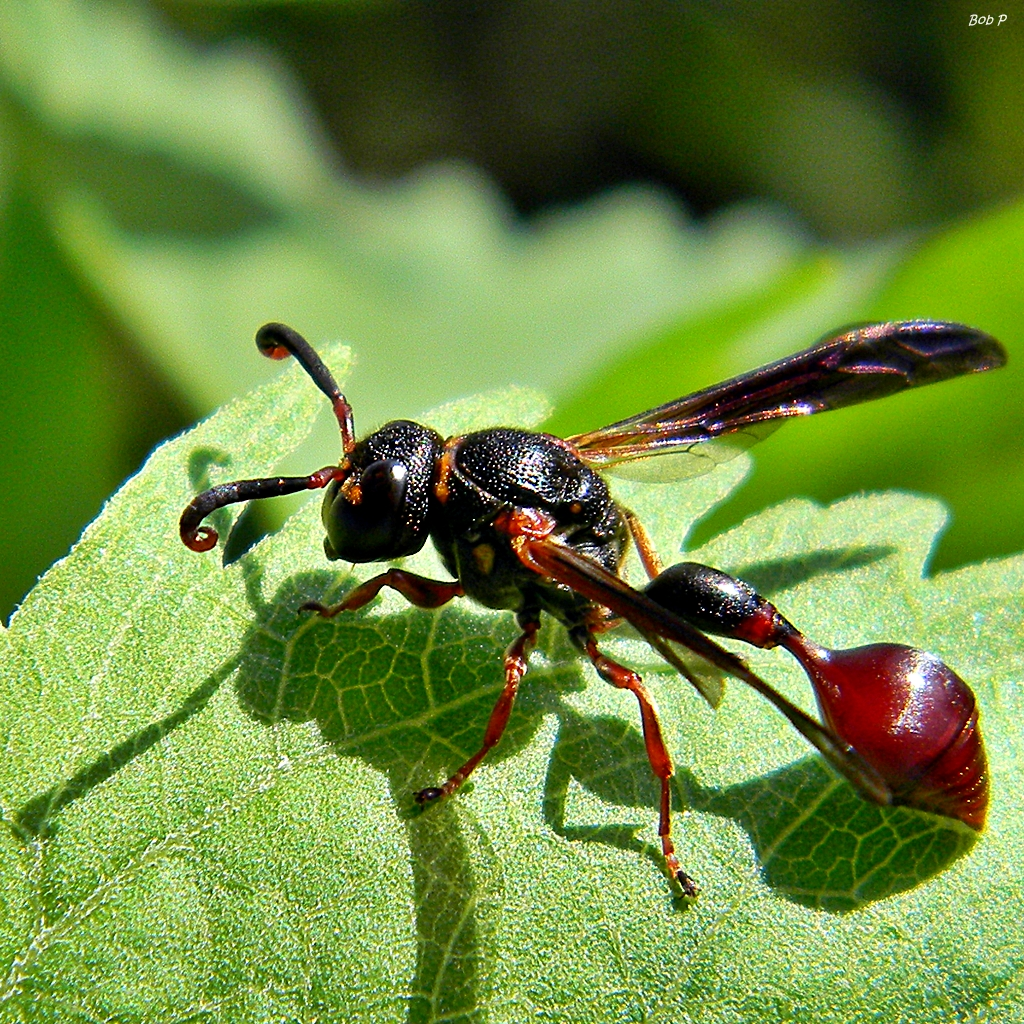

Scientific classification
- Kingdom: Animalia
- Phylum: Arthropoda
- Clade: Pancrustacea
- Class: Insecta
- Order: Hymenoptera
- Family: Vespidae
- Genus: Zethus
- Species: Z. slossonae

Binomial name
- Zethus slossonae Fox, 1892

= Zethus slossonae =

Species of wasp

Zethus slossonae, known as slosson's mason wasp, is a species of stinging wasp in the family Vespidae.

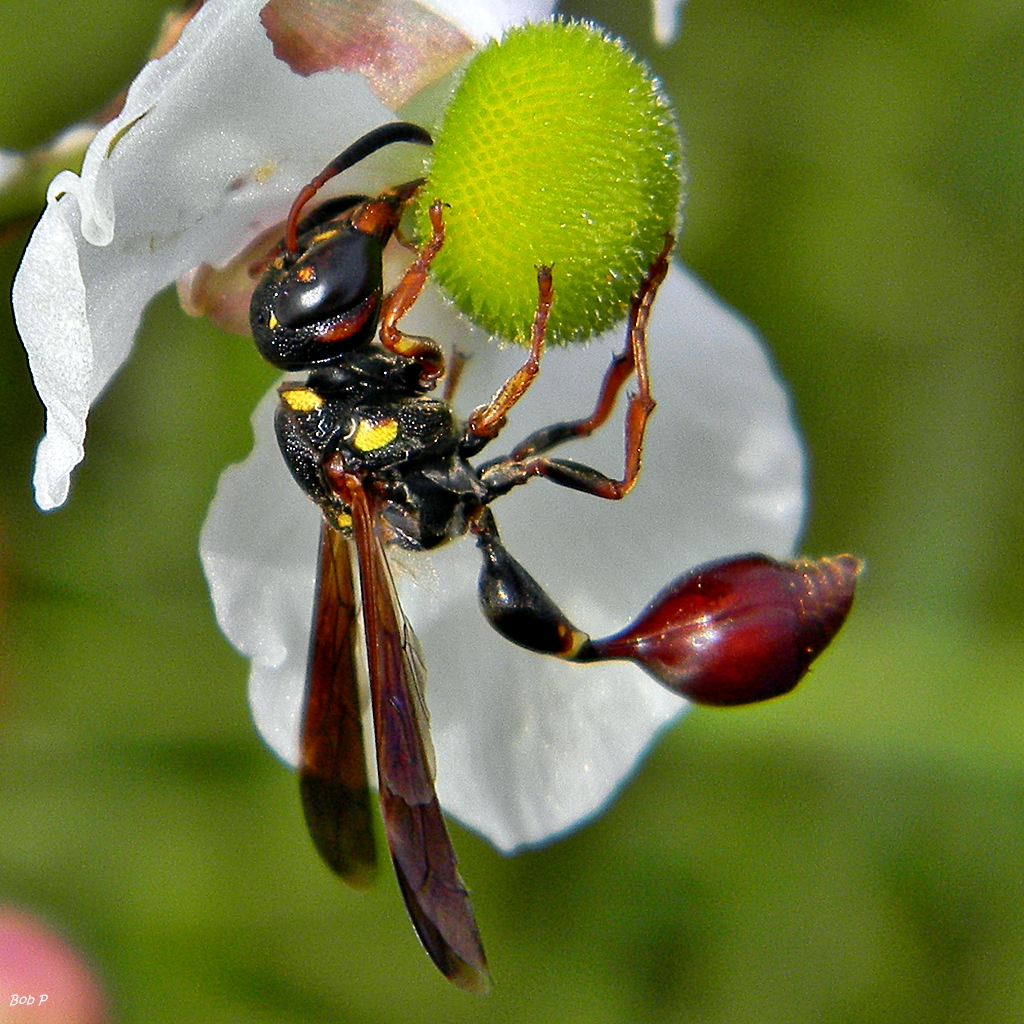
