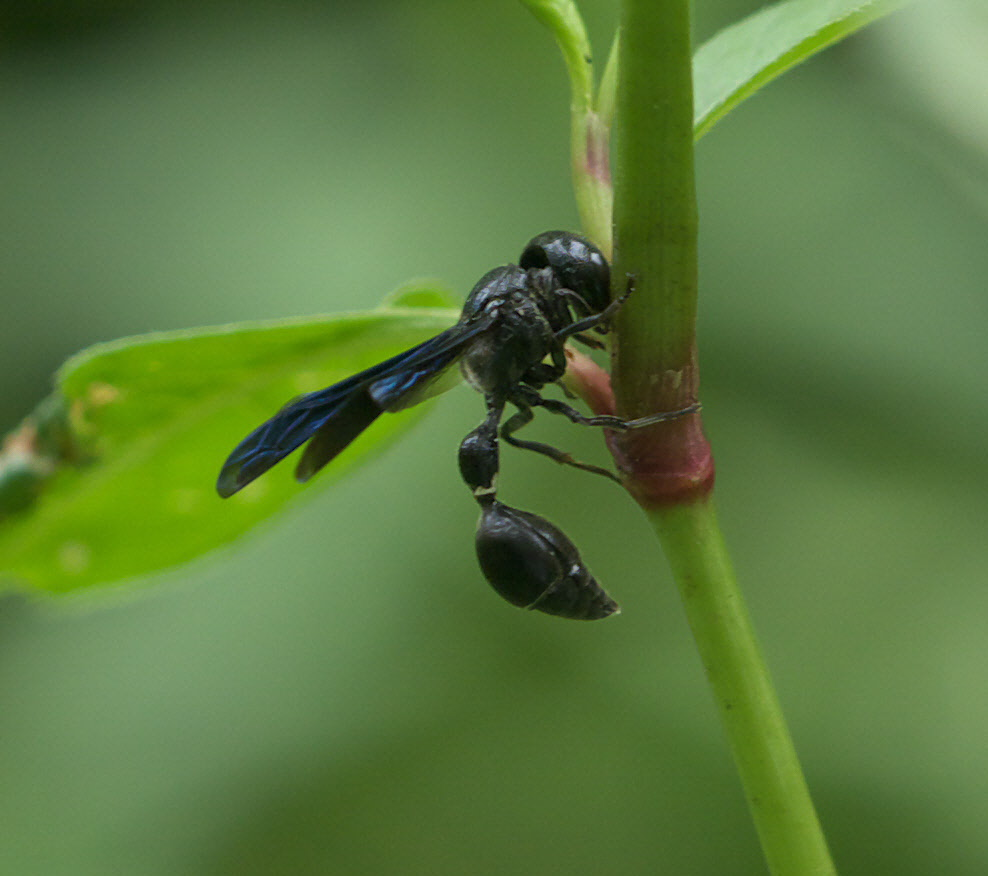

Scientific classification
- Kingdom: Animalia
- Phylum: Arthropoda
- Clade: Pancrustacea
- Class: Insecta
- Order: Hymenoptera
- Family: Vespidae
- Genus: Zethus
- Species: Z. spinipes

Binomial name
- Zethus spinipes Say, 1837

= Zethus spinipes =

Species of wasp

Zethus spinipes is a species of stinging wasp in the family Vespidae found in the eastern United States.

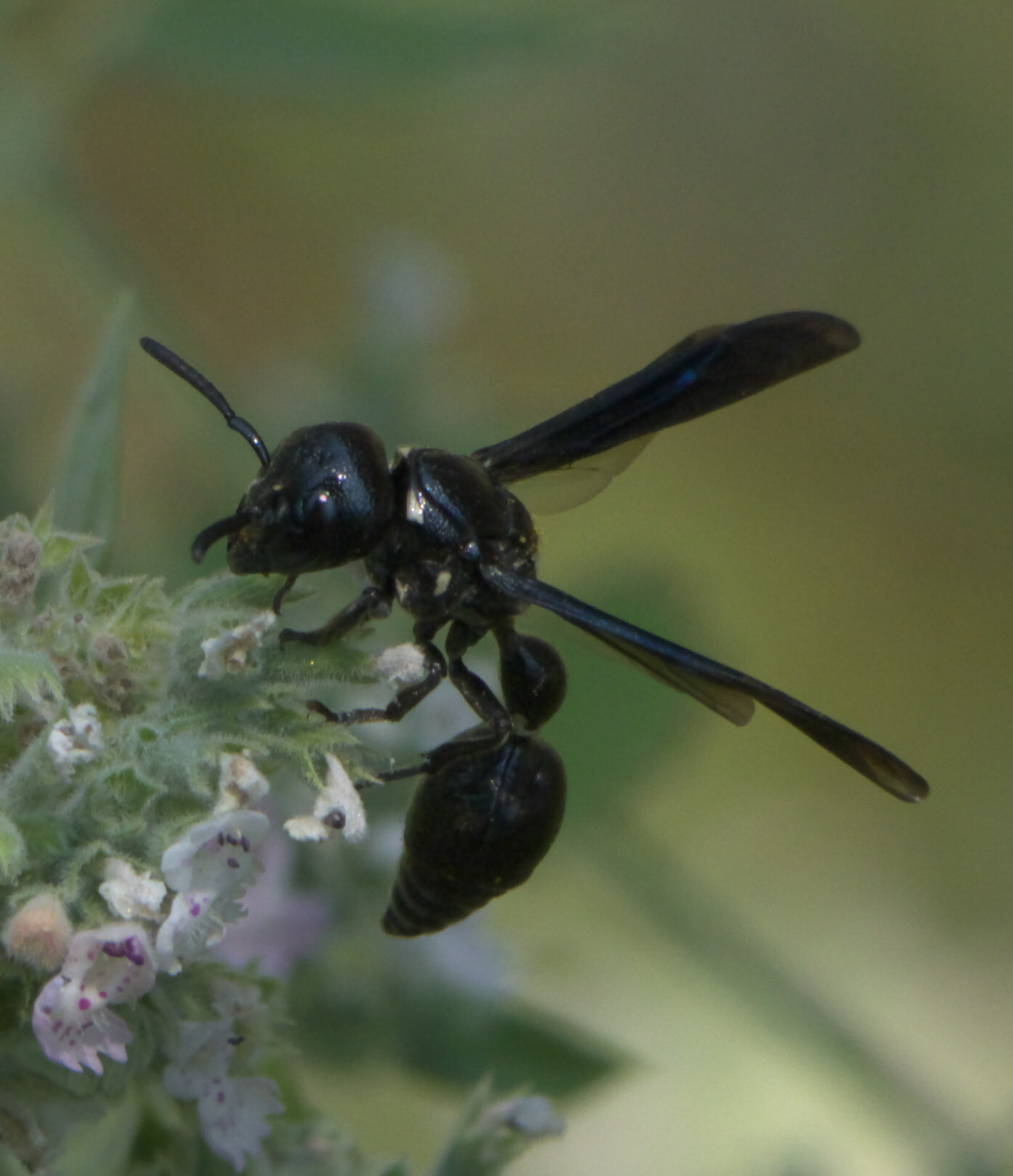

== Subspecies ==
These two subspecies belong to the species Zethus spinipes:

- Zethus spinipes spinipes^{g b} - ranges northward from Virginia to Massachusetts and westward to Kansas.
- Zethus spinipes variegatus de Saussure, 1852^{g b}- ranges from Maryland southward to the tip of peninsular Florida and westward to Texas.

Data sources: i = ITIS, c = Catalogue of Life, g = GBIF, b = Bugguide.net
