= Calligaster =

Scientific classification
- Kingdom: Animalia
- Phylum: Arthropoda
- Clade: Pancrustacea
- Class: Insecta
- Order: Hymenoptera
- Family: Vespidae
- Subfamily: Zethinae
- Genus: Calligaster; Saussure, 1852

Species
- Calligaster cyanopterus (Saussure, 1852); Calligaster etchellsii (Cameron, 1909); Calligaster himalayensis (Cameron, 1904); Calligaster ilocana Selis, 2022; Calligaster inflata; Calligaster viridipennis Giordani Soika, 1958; Calligaster williamsi Bequaert, 1940

Genus of wasps

Calligaster is an indomalayan genus of potter wasps. They make small nests of leaves and are subsocial.
