= Calliaster hystrix =

Scientific classification
- Kingdom: Animalia
- Phylum: Echinodermata
- Class: Asteroidea
- Order: Valvatida
- Family: Goniasteridae
- Genus: Calliaster
- Species: C. hystrix

Binomial name
- Calliaster hystrix Mah, 2026

Species of sea star

Calliaster hystrix is a species of sea star in the family Goniasteridae found off New Caledonia and in the Coral Sea.

== Etymology ==
The species epithet hystrix is derived from the Greek for "porcupine", alluding to the many marginal spines present on this species.

== Taxonomy and systematics ==
This species is distinguished from the Australian Calliaster erucaradiatus by the presence of multiple bivalve pedicellariae on nearly every actinal plate, significantly fewer spines on the interradial abactinal regions, and by having 8 to 11 furrow spines (versus 6 to 7 in C. erucaradiatus). It is similar to Calliaster kanak in sharing numerous abutted supermarginal plates and prominent spines but differs in displaying numerous bivalve pedicellariae, which appear to be absent in C. kanak. The spination on the superomarginal and inferomarginal plates is also more serial in C. hystrix than in C. kanak.

== Description ==
The species has a strongly thick, stellate body with elongate, upturned arms. Abactinal plates are smooth and bare, with no surficial accessories. Distinct carinal spines are present, but interradial areas on the disk are spineless. Superomarginal plates, 10–15, are abutted along the arm, with 5 to 8 free on the disk. Large conical spines are present on all superomarginal plates, with two series present on the disk. Bivalve pedicellariae are present on nearly all actinal plates. Furrow spines number 8 to 11, mostly ten.

== Distribution and habitat ==
This species is known from off New Caledonia and the Coral Sea at depths of 140 to 428 meters.
