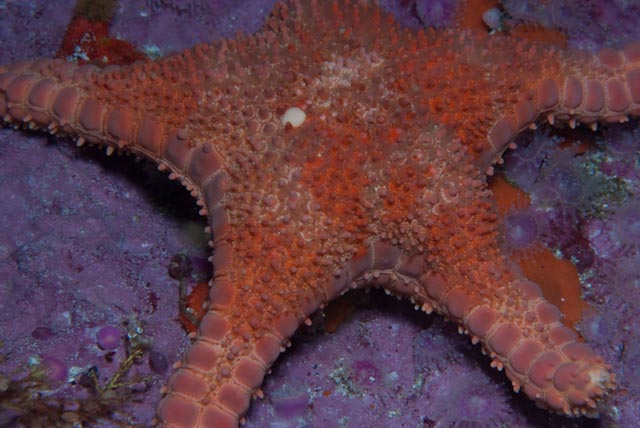
- Calliaster baccatus

Scientific classification
- Kingdom: Animalia
- Phylum: Echinodermata
- Class: Asteroidea
- Order: Valvatida
- Family: Goniasteridae
- Genus: Calliaster; Gray, 1840

Species
- See text

= Calliaster =

Genus of starfishes

Calliaster is a genus of starfish in the family Goniasteridae

== Species ==
The genus Calliaster includes the following species:

- Calliaster acanthodes H.L. Clark, 1923
- Calliaster aquamontis Mah, 2026
- Calliaster baccatus Sladen, 1889
- Calliaster childreni Gray, 1840
- Calliaster corynetes Fisher, 1913
- Calliaster elegans Doderlein, 1922
- Calliaster erucaradiatus Livingstone, 1936
- Calliaster hystrix Mah, 2026
- Calliaster kanak Mah, 2026
- Calliaster kyros Mah, 2026
- Calliaster mamillifer Alcock, 1893
- Calliaster nazaninae Mah, 2026
- Calliaster pedicellaris Fisher, 1906
- Calliaster quadrispinus Liao, 1989
- Calliaster regenerator Doderlein, 1922
- Calliaster spinosus H.L. Clark, 1916
- Calliaster thompsonae H.E.S. Clark, 2001
- Calliaster wanganellensis (H.L. Clark & McKnight, 2001)
