= Argentozethus =

Scientific classification
- Kingdom: Animalia
- Phylum: Arthropoda
- Clade: Pancrustacea
- Class: Insecta
- Order: Hymenoptera
- Family: Vespidae
- Genus: Argentozethus; Stange, 1979
- Species: A. willinki

Binomial name
- Argentozethus willinki Stange, 1979

Genus of wasps

Argentozethus is a neotropical genus of potter wasps restricted to north-western Argentina, containing a single species, Argentozethus willinki.
