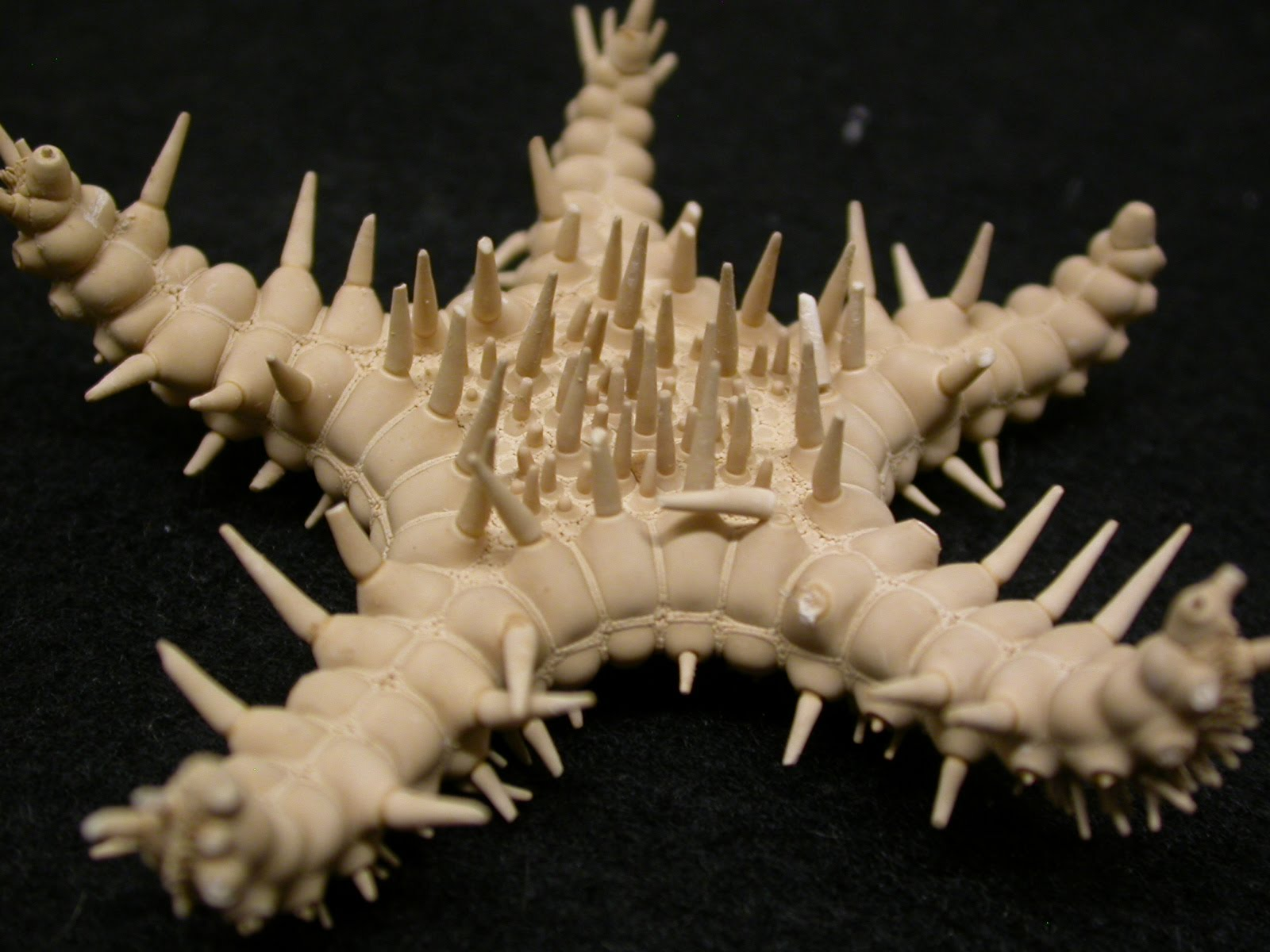

Scientific classification
- Kingdom: Animalia
- Phylum: Echinodermata
- Class: Asteroidea
- Order: Valvatida
- Family: Goniasteridae
- Genus: Calliaster
- Species: C. elegans

Binomial name
- Calliaster elegans Doderlein, 1922

= Calliaster elegans =

Species of starfish

Calliaster elegans is a species of starfish in the genus Calliaster.
