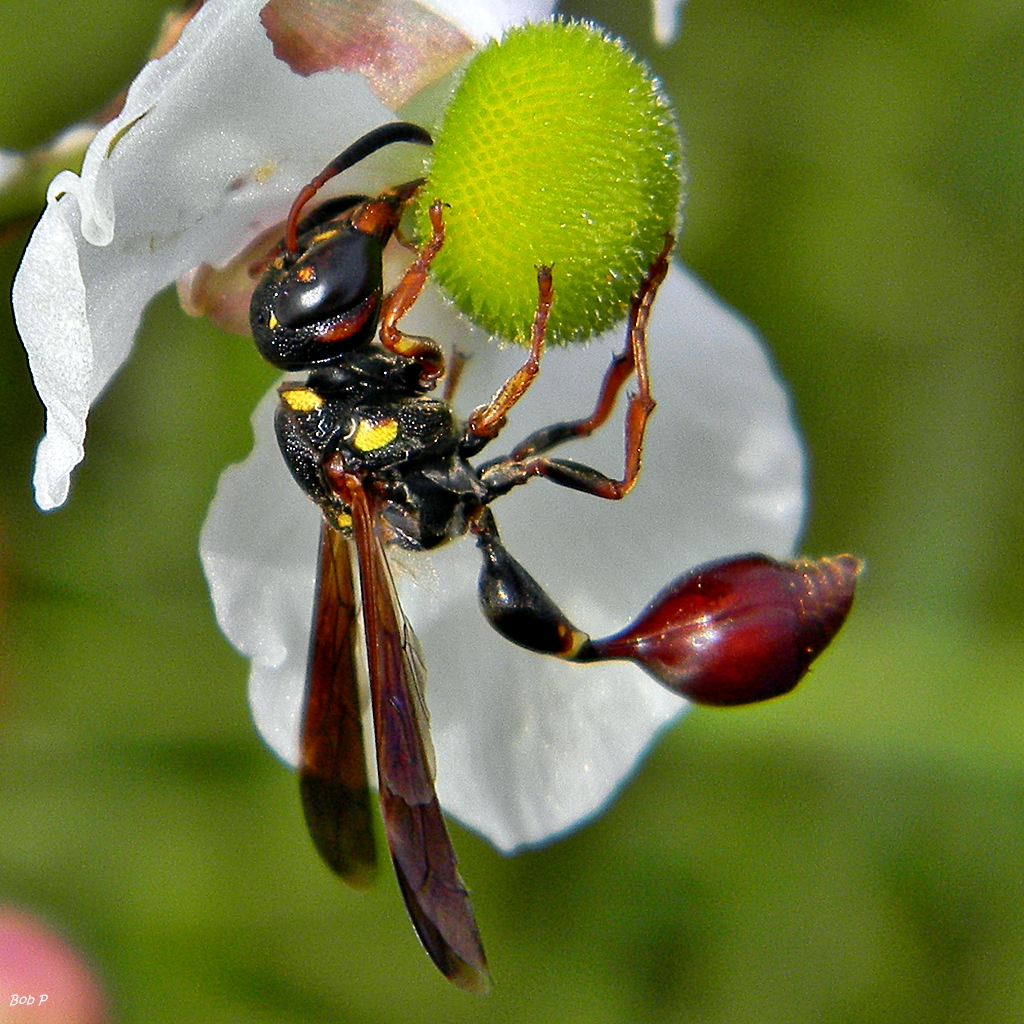
- Zethus slossonae

Scientific classification
- Kingdom: Animalia
- Phylum: Arthropoda
- Clade: Pancrustacea
- Class: Insecta
- Order: Hymenoptera
- Family: Vespidae
- Subfamily: Zethinae
- Genus: Zethus; Fabricius, 1804

Type species
- Vespa coeruleopennis Fabricius, 1798

Species
- About 300 species see List of Zethus species

= Zethus (wasp) =

Genus of wasps

Zethus is a very large, mainly neotropical genus of potter wasps with some species representation also in the Nearctic, Afrotropical, Australian and Indomalayan regions.

The genus is subdivided into a few subgenera which nevertheless need a phylogenetic analysis to recognize their natural limits.

== Species ==
See the separate list of Zethus species.
