= Edmund Meade-Waldo =

English ornithologist and conservationist

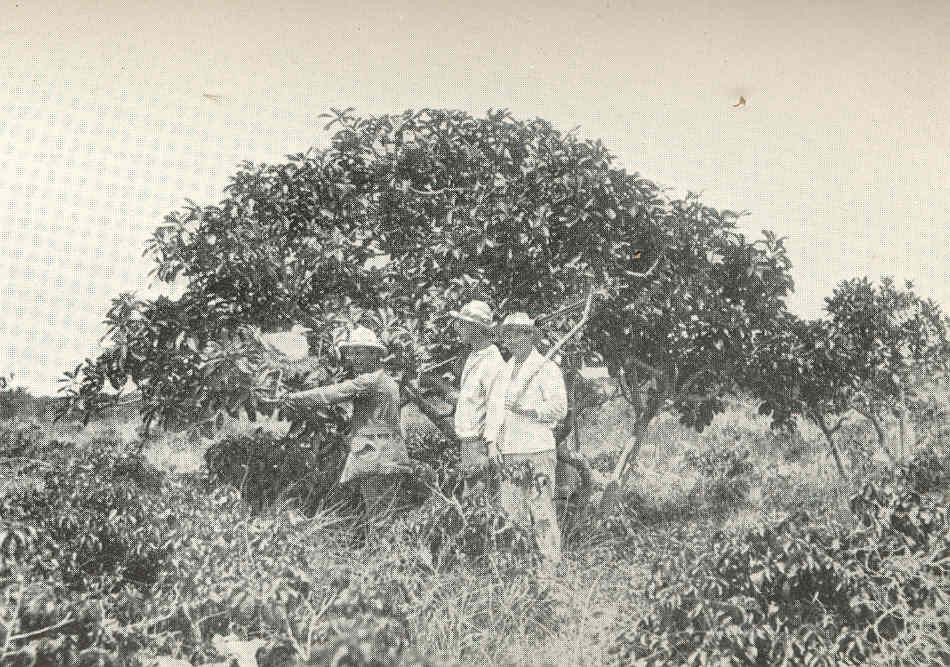
- Edmund Meade-Waldo and other members of the Valhalla expedition posing with a red-footed booby on Assumption Island
- Born: Edmund Gustavus Bloomfield Meade-Waldo; 8 February 1855; Hollybrook House, near Skibbereen, County Cork, Ireland
- Died: 24 February 1934 (aged 79); Chiddingstone, Kent
- Education: Eton College; Magdalene College, Cambridge
- Known for: Discovery of sandgrouse chick rearing behaviour
- Scientific career
- Fields: Ornithology
- Workplaces: Morocco, Canary Islands, mainland Spain
- Author abbrev. (zoology): Meade-Waldo

Edmund Gustavus Bloomfield Meade-Waldo (8 February 1855 – 24 February 1934) was an English ornithologist and conservationist. He is probably best known for his efforts to preserve the red kite in Wales.

== Life ==
Meade-Waldo was born at Hollybrook House, near Skibbereen, County Cork, the son of Edmund Waldo and his wife Harriette Ellen Becher, daughter of Henry Owens Becher of Aughadown. He was educated at Eton College. He kept many animals in his room and it was rumoured that he had an aim to kill a red-deer in Windsor forest and was able to do so. He matriculated at Magdalene College, Cambridge in 1875. In 1877 he was a lieutenant in the West Kent Militia.

Meade-Waldo married Ada Coralie, daughter of Lord Baggallay and they lived at Rope Hill, New Forest. He spent his life managing the family's country estate, Stonewall, in Kent.

== Ornithology ==
Meade-Waldo conducted fieldwork and collected birds in the Atlas Mountains of Morocco, the Canary Islands and Spain, the presumably-extinct Canary Islands oystercatcher Haematopus meadewaldoi being foremost among them. He was vice-president of the BOU in 1923 and was an active member of the Zoological Society of London, the Royal Society for the Protection of Birds, the Society for the Protection of the Fauna of the Empire and the Society for the Establishment of Nature Reserves. He was also Justice of the Peace for Kent.

Meade-Waldo's discovery of sandgrouse chick rearing behaviour in 1896 was for a long time discredited as fantasy. His acute observations noted male sandgrouse, by deliberately soaking their breast feathers in water, bringing water to its chicks at the nest. Sixty years later he was proved right.

Meade-Waldo was a hawk-fancier and was a friend of several others in the pursuit including Lord Lilford, Aubyn Trevor-Battye, Gage Freeman and others. He often set his hawks on other birds and wrote about the chases in his diaries. He was a close friend of Henry Elwes. Herbert St. Quintin and Lord Grey regularly met at Fallodon. He accompanied James Lindsay, 26th Earl of Crawford and the naturalist Michael John Nicoll on their third voyage on the RYS Valhalla; on 7 December 1905 at about 10:15 am the yacht, was cruising off the Florida coast when a "large fin, or frill, sticking out of the water," was spotted. This frill was six feet in length and projected nearly two feet out of the water. "A great neck rose out of the water in front of the frill," noted Meade-Waldo; its neck appeared to be about the thickness of a man's body. This creature moved its head and neck from side to side in a peculiar manner. This sea serpent incident became famous and caused much interest back home in Britain.

== Other sources ==
- Hanson, T., 2011. Feathers: The Evolution of A Natural Miracle ISBN 978-0465028788
- Mearns, B. & Mearns, R., 1988. Biographies for birdwatchers: the lives of those commemorated in western palearctic bird names, London: Academic Press.
- Three voyages of a naturalist : being an account of many little- known islands in three oceans visited by the "Valhalla," R.Y.S. / by M. J. Nicoll; with an introduction by the Earl of Crawford
- P. R. L., 1934. Obituary of Edmund Gustavus Bloomfield Meade-Waldo. Ibis. 76(2), pp399–402.
