= E. foraminatus =

E. foraminatus may refer to:

- Echidnocerus foraminatus, the brown box crab, a species of king crab
- Euodynerus foraminatus, a species of mason wasp in the family Vespidae
