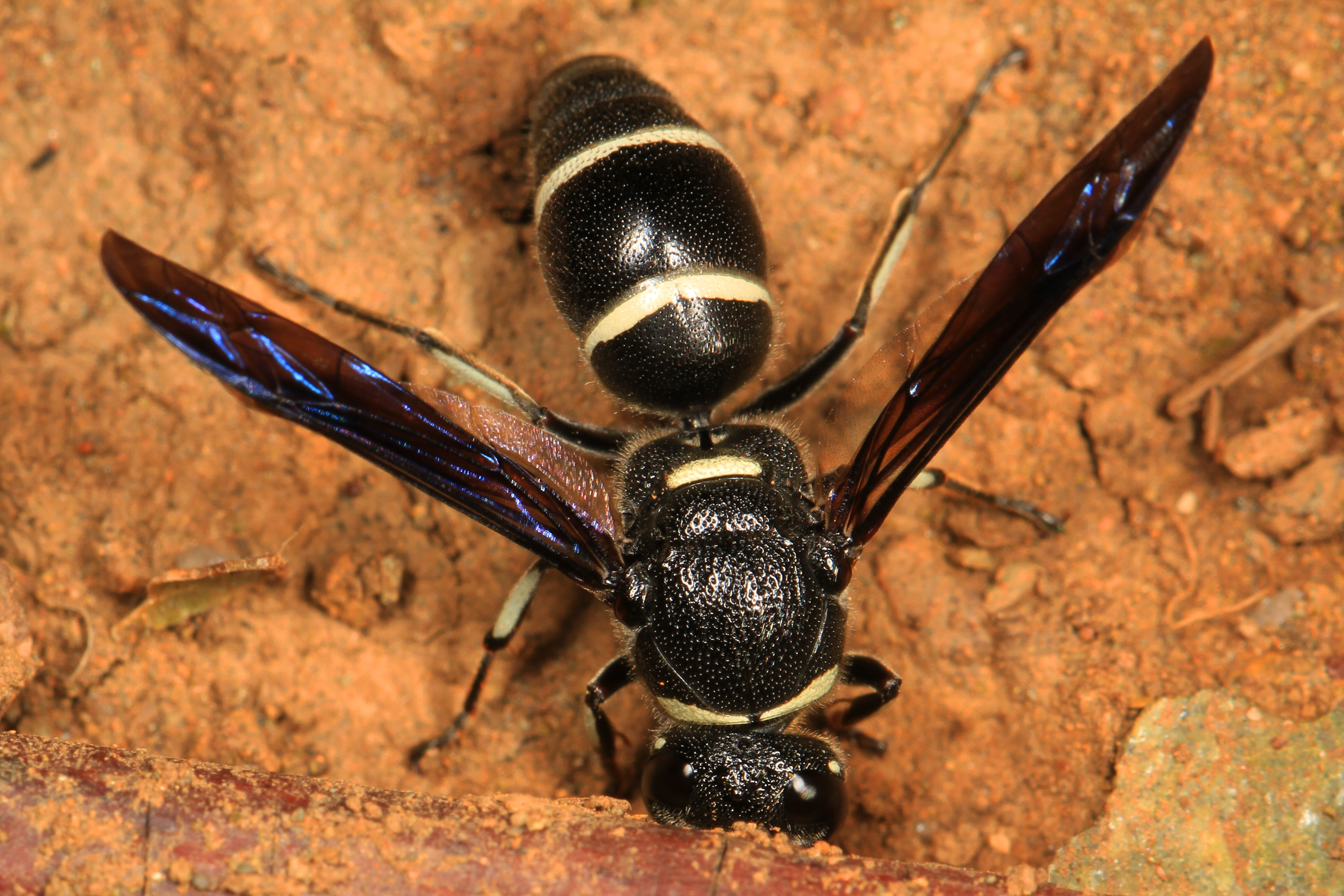

Scientific classification
- Domain: Eukaryota
- Kingdom: Animalia
- Phylum: Arthropoda
- Class: Insecta
- Order: Hymenoptera
- Family: Vespidae
- Genus: Euodynerus
- Species: E. schwarzi

Binomial name
- Euodynerus schwarzi (Krombein, 1962)

= Euodynerus schwarzi =

Species of wasp

Euodynerus schwarzi is a nearctic species of potter wasp in the family Vespidae.
