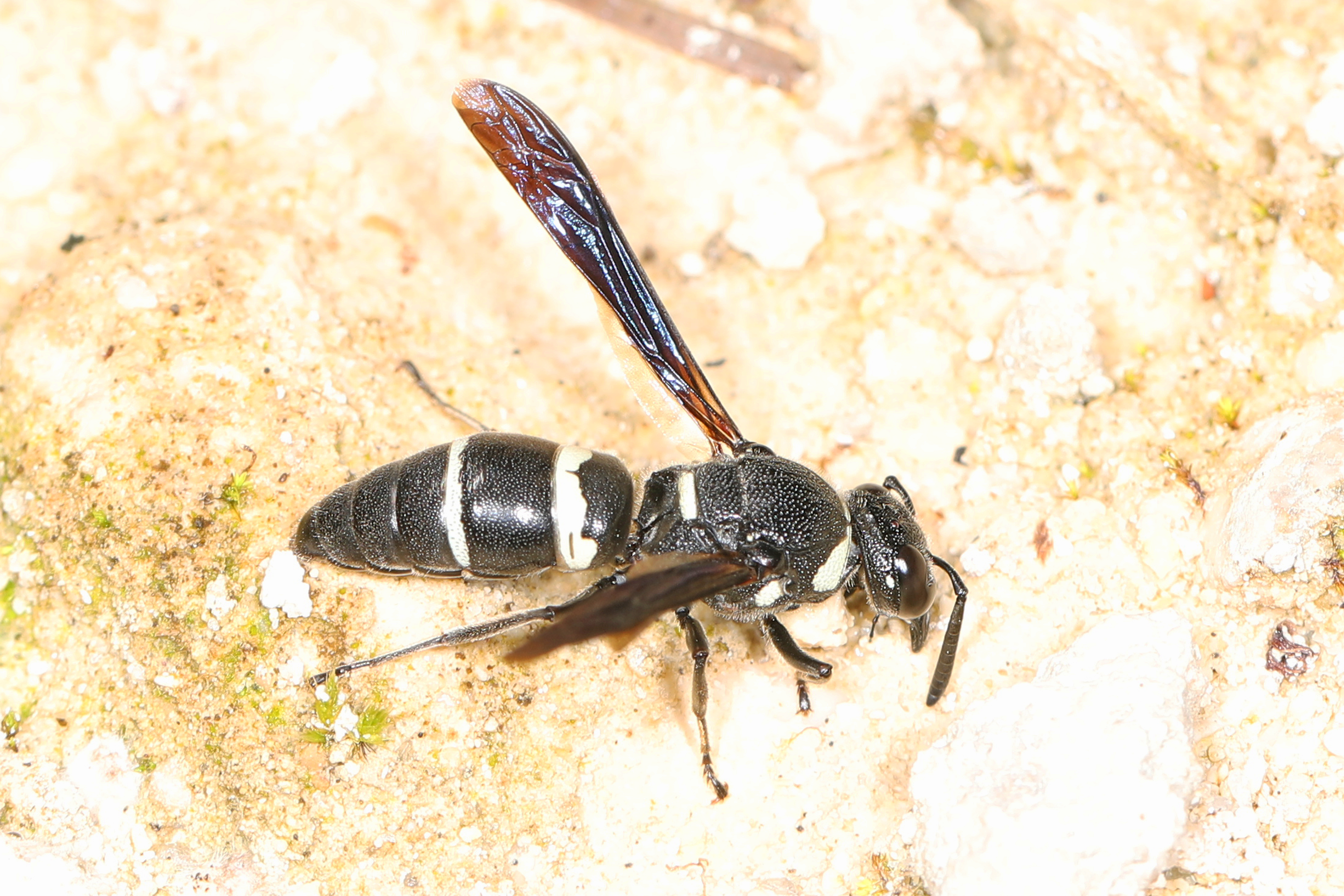

Scientific classification
- Kingdom: Animalia
- Phylum: Arthropoda
- Class: Insecta
- Order: Hymenoptera
- Family: Vespidae
- Genus: Euodynerus
- Species: E. megaera

Binomial name
- Euodynerus megaera (Lepeletier, 1841)

= Euodynerus megaera =

Species of wasp

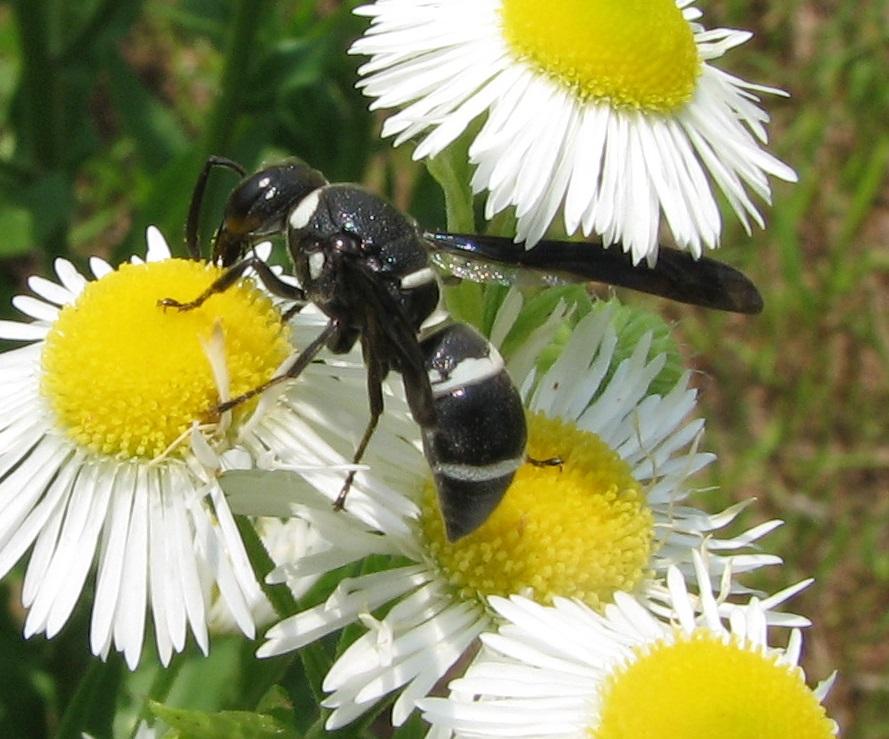
E. megaera female

Euodynerus megaera is a species of stinging wasp in the family Vespidae.
