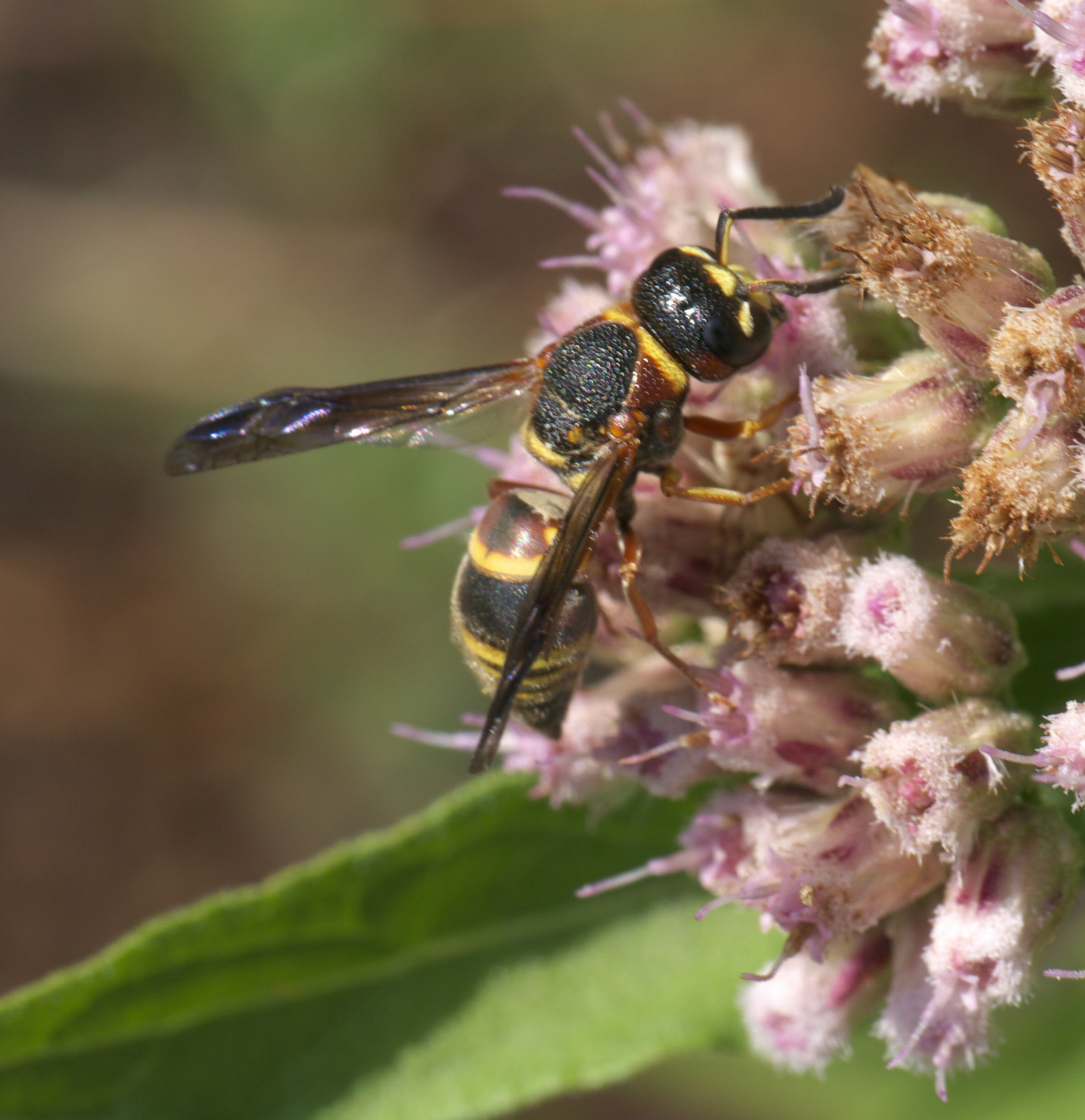

Scientific classification
- Domain: Eukaryota
- Kingdom: Animalia
- Phylum: Arthropoda
- Class: Insecta
- Order: Hymenoptera
- Family: Vespidae
- Genus: Euodynerus
- Species: E. annulatus

Binomial name
- Euodynerus annulatus (Say, 1824)

= Euodynerus annulatus =

Species of wasp

Euodynerus annulatus is a species of mason wasp in the family Vespidae.

== Subspecies ==
These five subspecies belong to the species Euodynerus annulatus:

- Euodynerus annulatus annulatus (Say, 1824)
- Euodynerus annulatus arvensis (de Saussure, 1869)
- Euodynerus annulatus evectus (Cresson, 1872)
- Euodynerus annulatus imperialis (Bohart, 1945)
- Euodynerus annulatus sulphureus (de Saussure, 1858)
