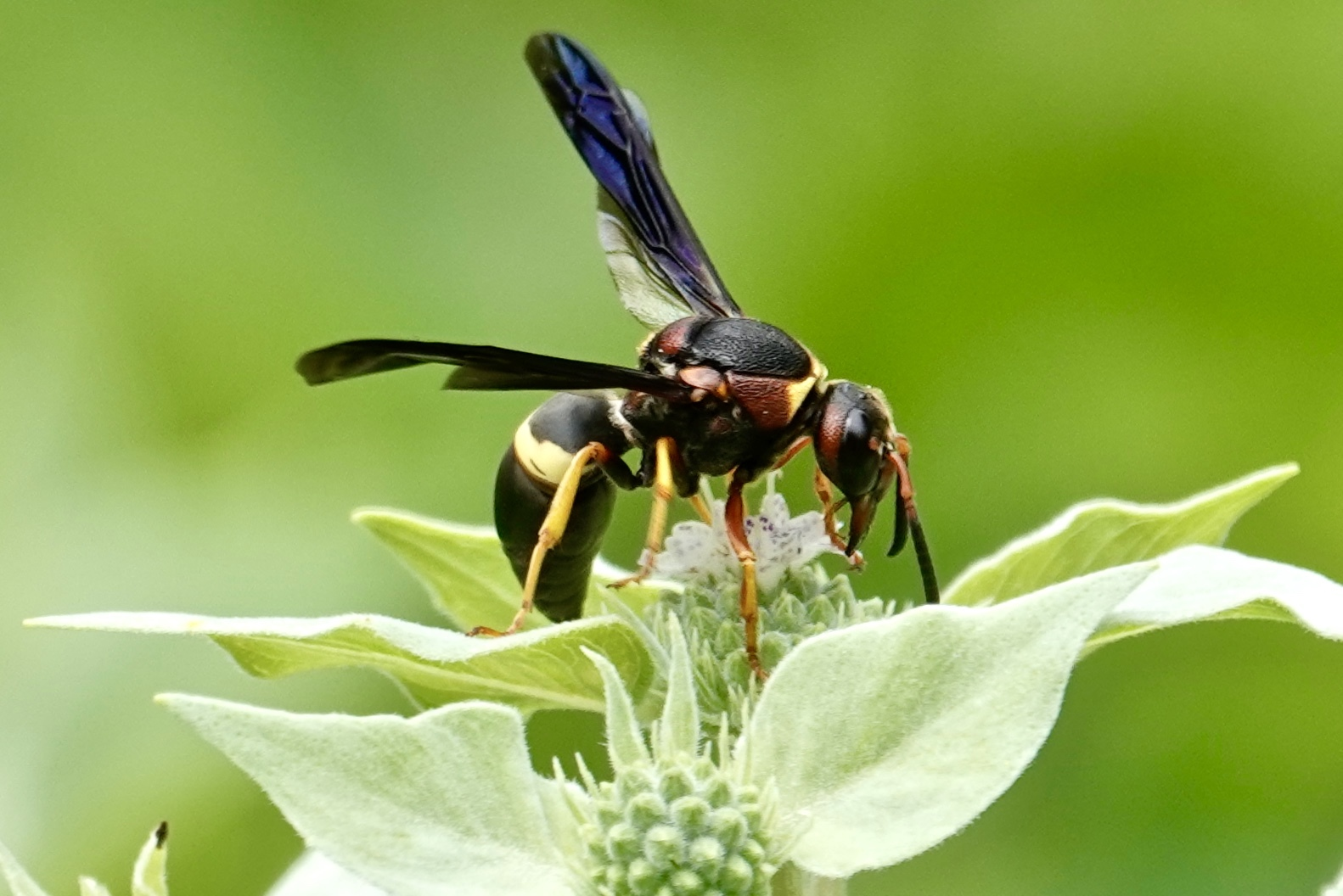

Scientific classification
- Domain: Eukaryota
- Kingdom: Animalia
- Phylum: Arthropoda
- Class: Insecta
- Order: Hymenoptera
- Family: Vespidae
- Genus: Euodynerus
- Species: E. crypticus

Binomial name
- Euodynerus crypticus (Say, 1823)

= Euodynerus crypticus =

Species of wasp

Euodynerus crypticus is a species of stinging wasp in the family Vespidae.

== Subspecies ==
These three subspecies belong to the species Euodynerus crypticus:

- Euodynerus crypticus balteatus (Say, 1837)^{c g}
- Euodynerus crypticus crypticus^{g}
- Euodynerus crypticus stricklandi (Bequaert, 1940)^{c g}

Data sources: i = ITIS, c = Catalogue of Life, g = GBIF, b = Bugguide.net
