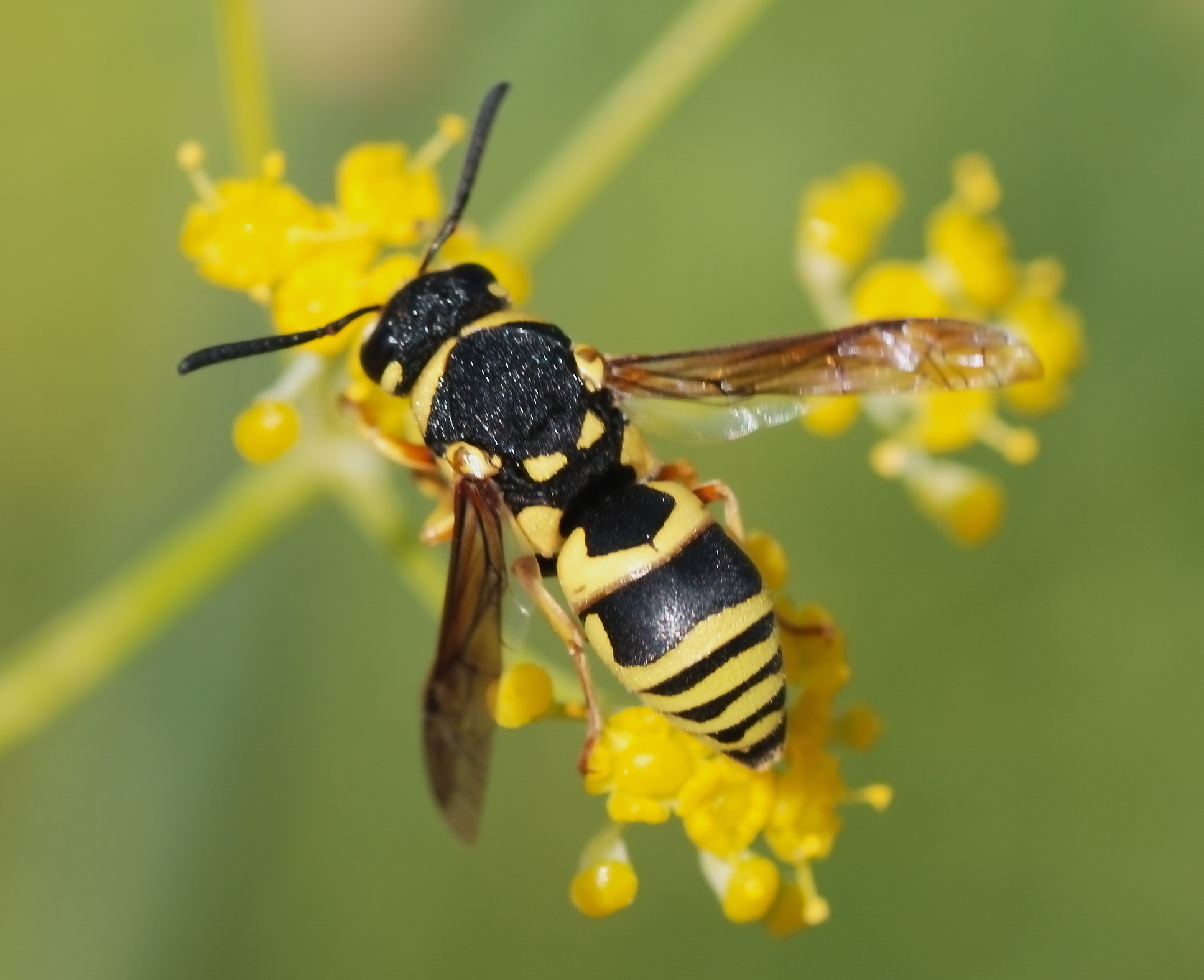
- Euodynerus sp

Scientific classification
- Kingdom: Animalia
- Phylum: Arthropoda
- Clade: Pancrustacea
- Class: Insecta
- Order: Hymenoptera
- Family: Vespidae
- Subfamily: Eumeninae
- Genus: Euodynerus; Dalla Torre, 1904

Type species
- Euodynerus dantici Rossi, 1790

= Euodynerus =

Genus of wasps

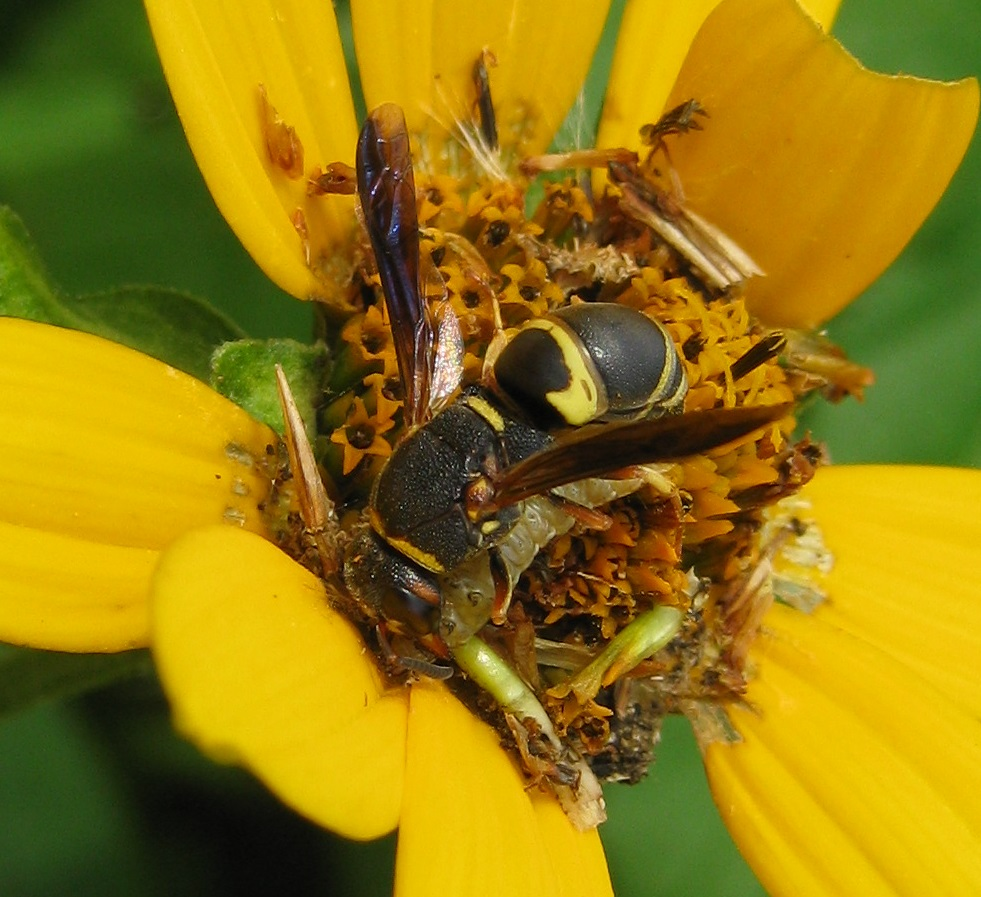
E. hidalgo boreoorientalis subduing a caterpillar prey

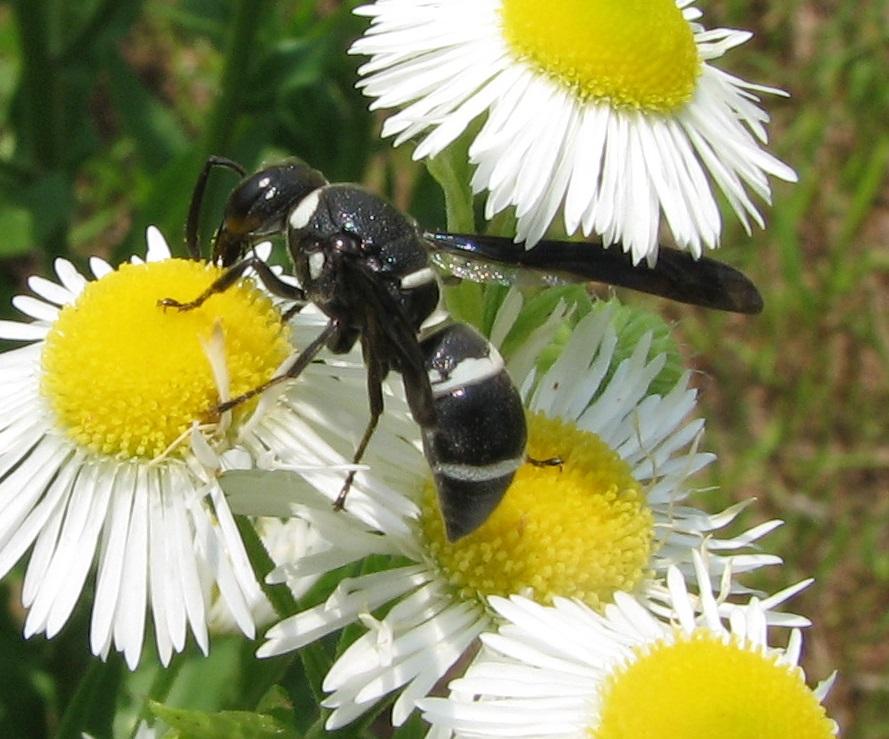
E. megaera female

Euodynerus is a genus of potter wasps with a mainly Holarctic distribution, though a number of species extend through Indomalayan, Australasian, Afrotropical and northern Neotropical regions. Also, a single species is reported from Hawaii.

== Species ==
Species within this genus include:

- Euodynerus aborigena
- Euodynerus adiacens
- Euodynerus afghanicus
- Euodynerus alaris
- Euodynerus alvarado
- Euodynerus angulatus
- Euodynerus annae
- Euodynerus annectens
- Euodynerus annulatus
- Euodynerus apicalis
- Euodynerus aspra
- Euodynerus auranus
- Euodynerus barberi
- Euodynerus bicingulatus
- Euodynerus bidens
- Euodynerus bidentatus
- Euodynerus bidentiformis
- Euodynerus bidentoides
- Euodynerus boscii
- Euodynerus breviventris
- Euodynerus caspicus
- Euodynerus castigatus
- Euodynerus catepetlensis
- Euodynerus cherkensis
- Euodynerus clatratus
- Euodynerus cluniculus
- Euodynerus convergens
- Euodynerus cordovae
- Euodynerus coriaceus
- Euodynerus crypticus
- Euodynerus curictensis
- Euodynerus cylindriventris
- Euodynerus dantici
- Euodynerus delicatus
- Euodynerus digiticornis
- Euodynerus discogaster
- Euodynerus disconotatus
- Euodynerus distinctus
- Euodynerus diversus
- Euodynerus effrenatus
- Euodynerus egregius
- Euodynerus enodatus
- Euodynerus espagnoli
- Euodynerus excellens
- Euodynerus exceptus
- Euodynerus exoglyphus
- Euodynerus familiaris
- Euodynerus fastidiosus
- Euodynerus foraminatus
- Euodynerus formosus
- Euodynerus fouadi
- Euodynerus gaullei
- Euodynerus gaya
- Euodynerus geometricus
- Euodynerus guerrero
- Euodynerus haitiensis
- Euodynerus hellenicus
- Euodynerus hidalgo
- Euodynerus histrionicus
- Euodynerus hottentotus
- Euodynerus khuzestanicus
- Euodynerus kilimandjaroensis
- Euodynerus koenigsmanni
- Euodynerus leucomelas
- Euodynerus localis
- Euodynerus longisetulosus
- Euodynerus macedonicus
- Euodynerus macswaini
- Euodynerus masariformis
- Euodynerus mavromoustakisi
- Euodynerus maximilianus
- Euodynerus megaera
- Euodynerus nahariensis
- Euodynerus nigripennis
- Euodynerus niloticus
- Euodynerus nipanicus
- Euodynerus notatus
- Euodynerus oslarensis
- Euodynerus pallidus
- Euodynerus planitarsis
- Euodynerus posticus
- Euodynerus pratensis
- Euodynerus provisoreus
- Euodynerus pseudocaspicus
- Euodynerus pseudocoriaceus
- Euodynerus pseudonotata
- Euodynerus quadrifaciatus
- Euodynerus quadrifasaciatus
- Euodynerus quadrifasciatus
- Euodynerus reflexus
- Euodynerus rhynchoides
- Euodynerus rufinus
- Euodynerus salzi
- Euodynerus schwarzi
- Euodynerus scudderi
- Euodynerus segregatus
- Euodynerus semiaethiopicus
- Euodynerus semidantici
- Euodynerus semisaecularis
- Euodynerus setosus
- Euodynerus seulii
- Euodynerus shirazensis
- Euodynerus siegberti
- Euodynerus socotrae
- Euodynerus soikai
- Euodynerus stigma
- Euodynerus strigatus
- Euodynerus subannulatus
- Euodynerus succinctus
- Euodynerus sulphuripes
- Euodynerus tempiferus
- Euodynerus tisiphone
- Euodynerus trilobus
- Euodynerus trituberculatus
- Euodynerus unifasciatus
- Euodynerus variegatus
- Euodynerus velutinus
- Euodynerus verticalis

== Gallery ==
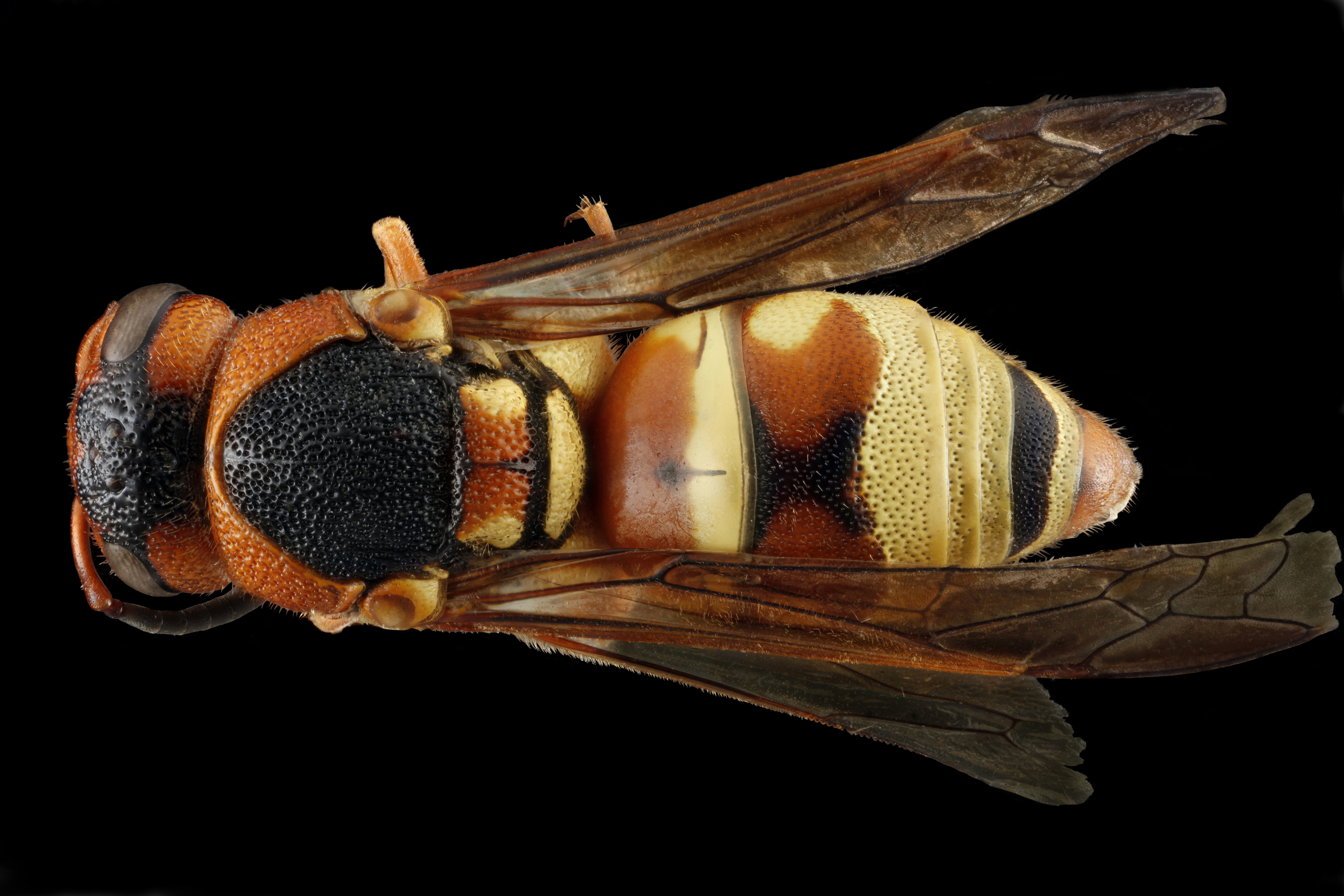
Euodynerus sp., a female from Yellowstone National Park, Wyoming

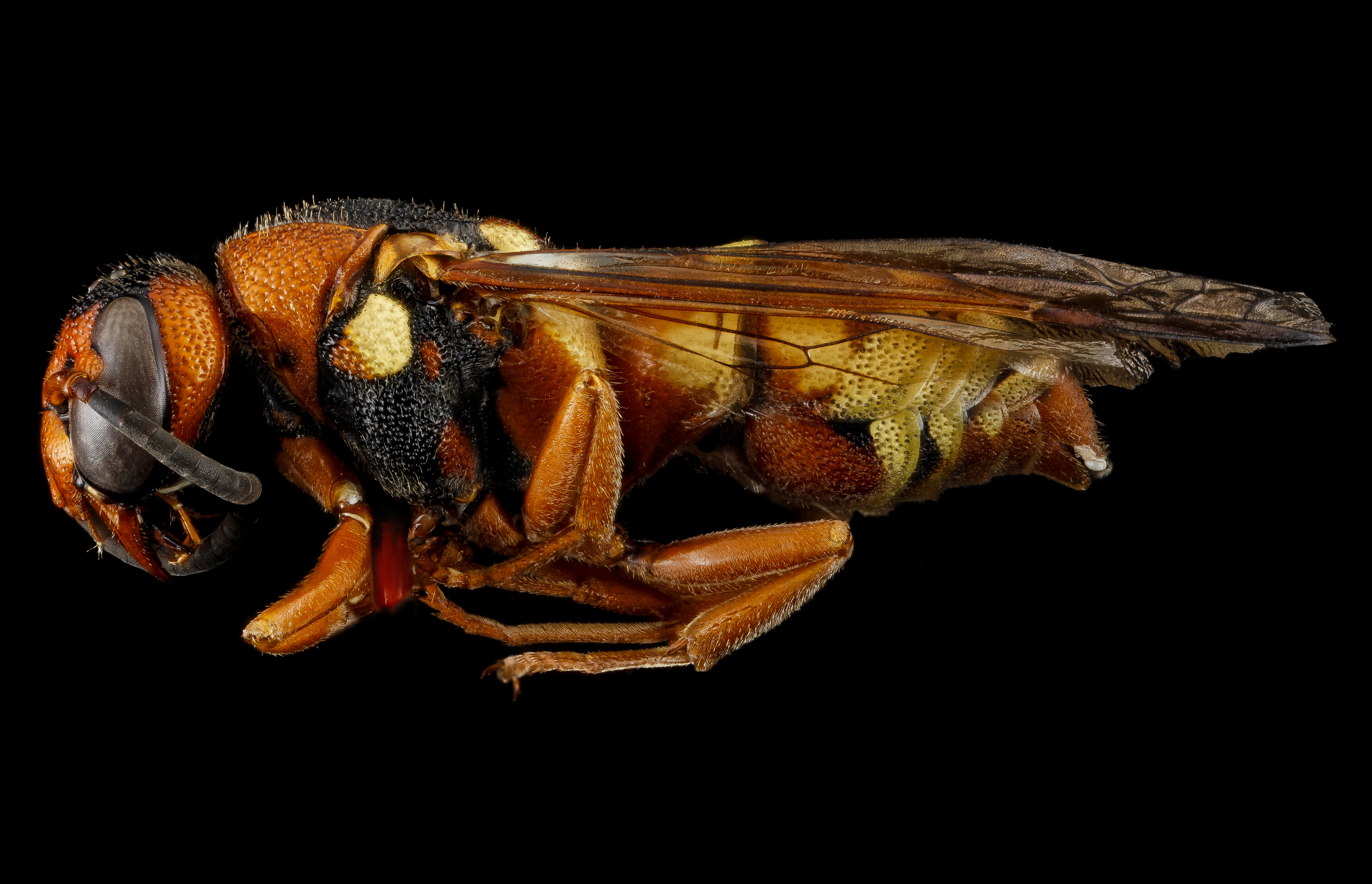
Euodynerus sp., a female from Yellowstone National Park
