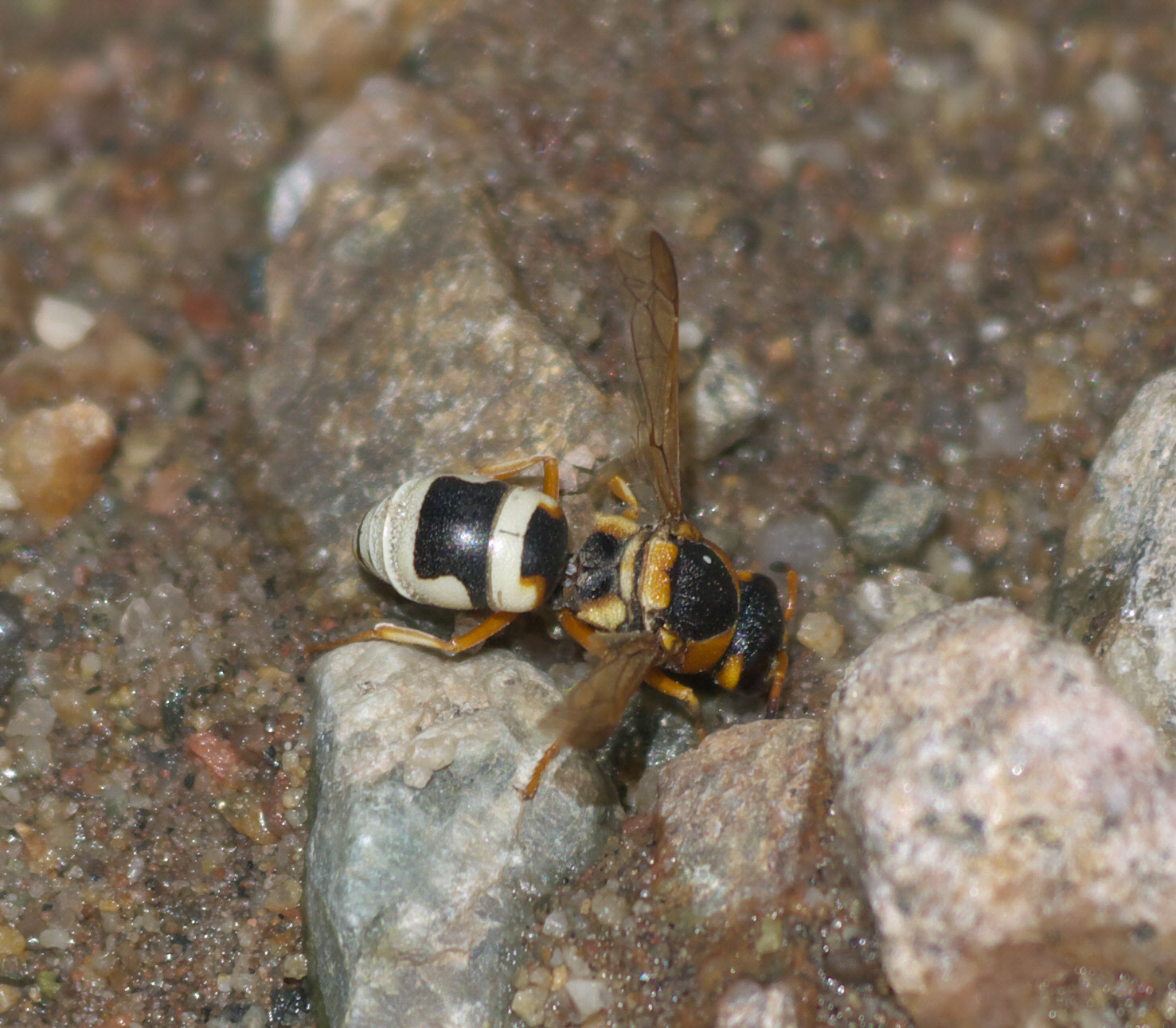

Scientific classification
- Kingdom: Animalia
- Phylum: Arthropoda
- Clade: Pancrustacea
- Class: Insecta
- Order: Hymenoptera
- Family: Vespidae
- Genus: Euodynerus
- Species: E. auranus

Binomial name
- Euodynerus auranus (Cameron, 1906)

= Euodynerus auranus =

Species of wasp

Euodynerus auranus is a species of stinging wasp in the family Vespidae.

== Subspecies ==
These four subspecies belong to the species Euodynerus auranus:

- Euodynerus auranus albivestis (Bohart, 1939)^{c g}
- Euodynerus auranus aquilus Bohart, 1974^{c g}
- Euodynerus auranus auranus^{g}
- Euodynerus auranus azotopus (Bohart, 1939)^{g b}

Data sources: i = ITIS, c = Catalogue of Life, g = GBIF, b = Bugguide.net
