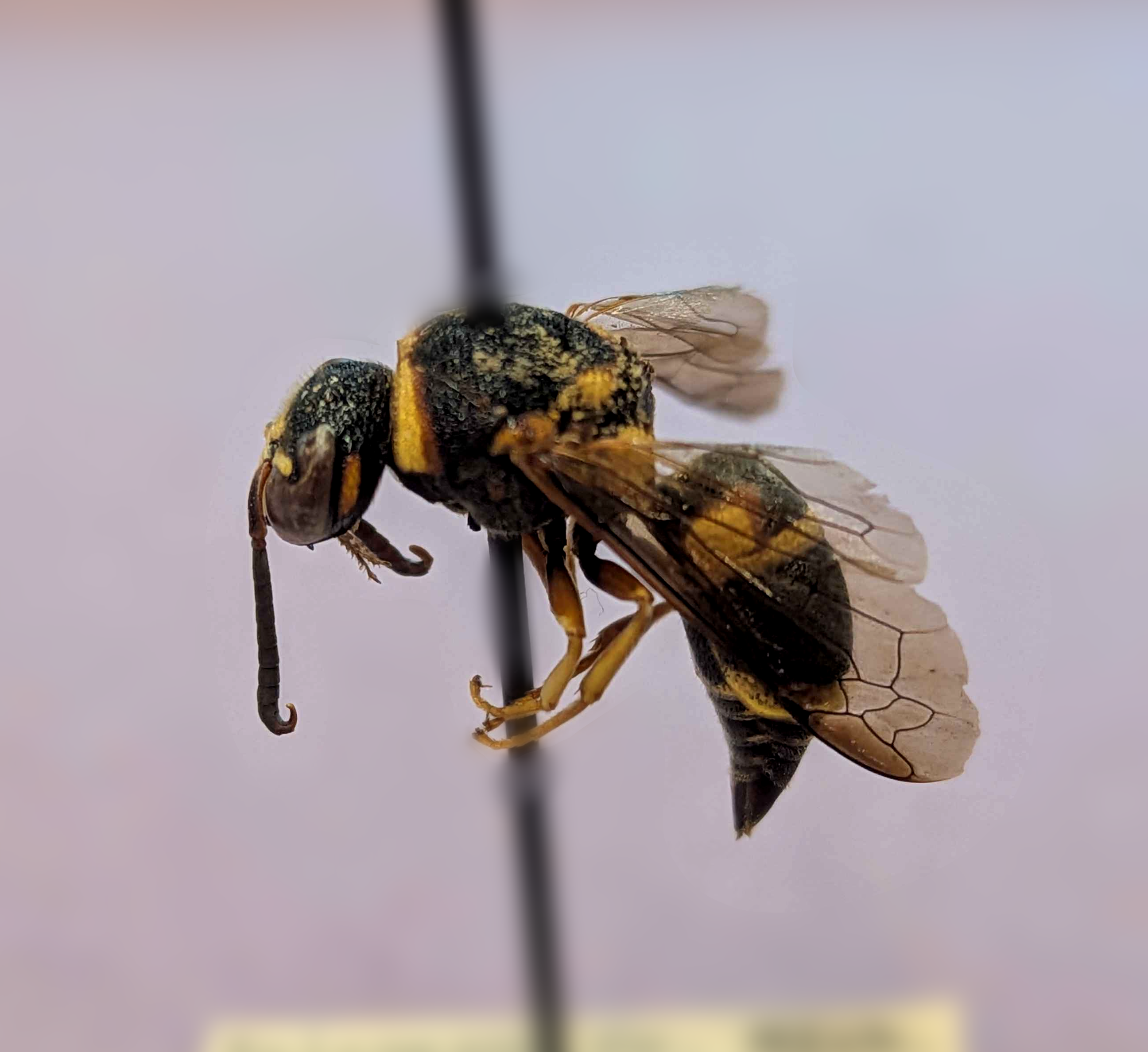

Scientific classification
- Kingdom: Animalia
- Phylum: Arthropoda
- Clade: Pancrustacea
- Class: Insecta
- Order: Hymenoptera
- Family: Vespidae
- Genus: Euodynerus
- Species: E. castigatus

Binomial name
- Euodynerus castigatus (de Saussure, 1853)

Synonyms
- Odynerus fuscus (Cresson, 1872)

= Euodynerus castigatus =

Species of wasp

Euodynerus castigatus is a species of potter wasp in the family Vespidae. It was first described by Henri de Saussure in 1853. Like most mason wasps, E. castigatus are solitary wasps that paralyze caterpillars, using it as food for E. castigatus larvae.
