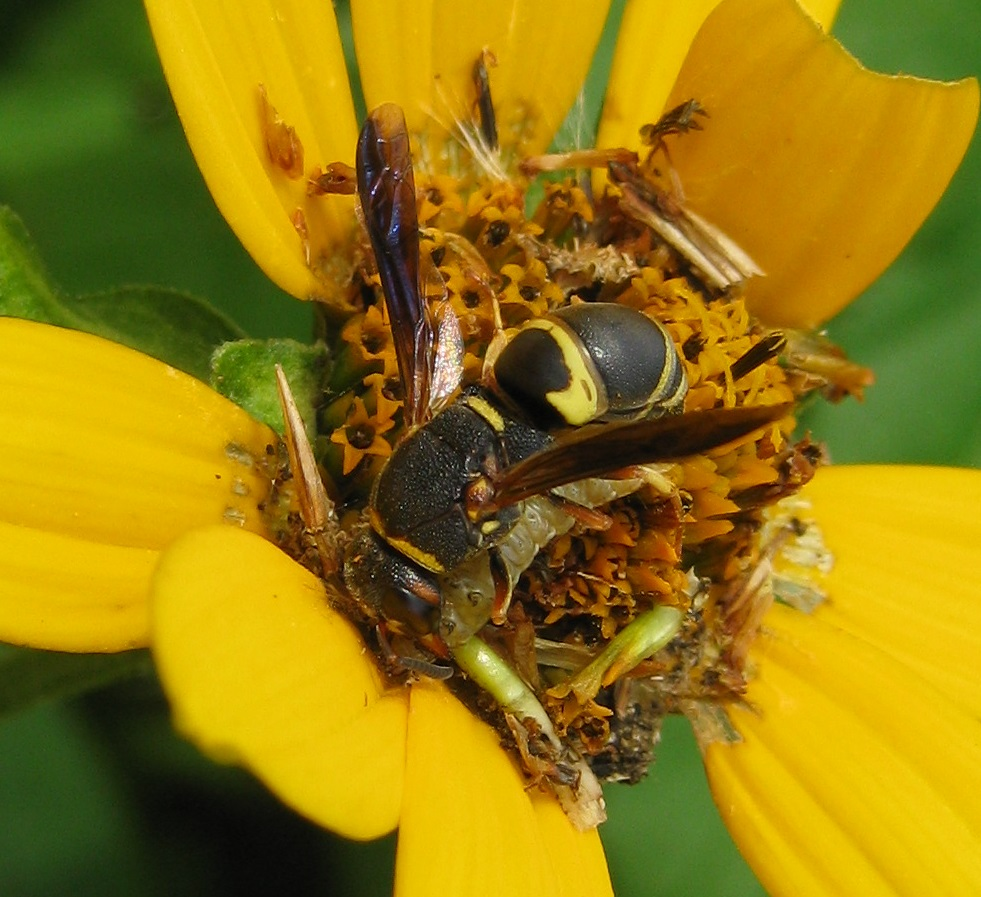
- E. hidalgo boreoorientalis subduing a caterpillar prey

Scientific classification
- Kingdom: Animalia
- Phylum: Arthropoda
- Class: Insecta
- Order: Hymenoptera
- Family: Vespidae
- Genus: Euodynerus
- Species: E. hidalgo

Binomial name
- Euodynerus hidalgo (de Saussure, 1857)

= Euodynerus hidalgo =

Species of wasp

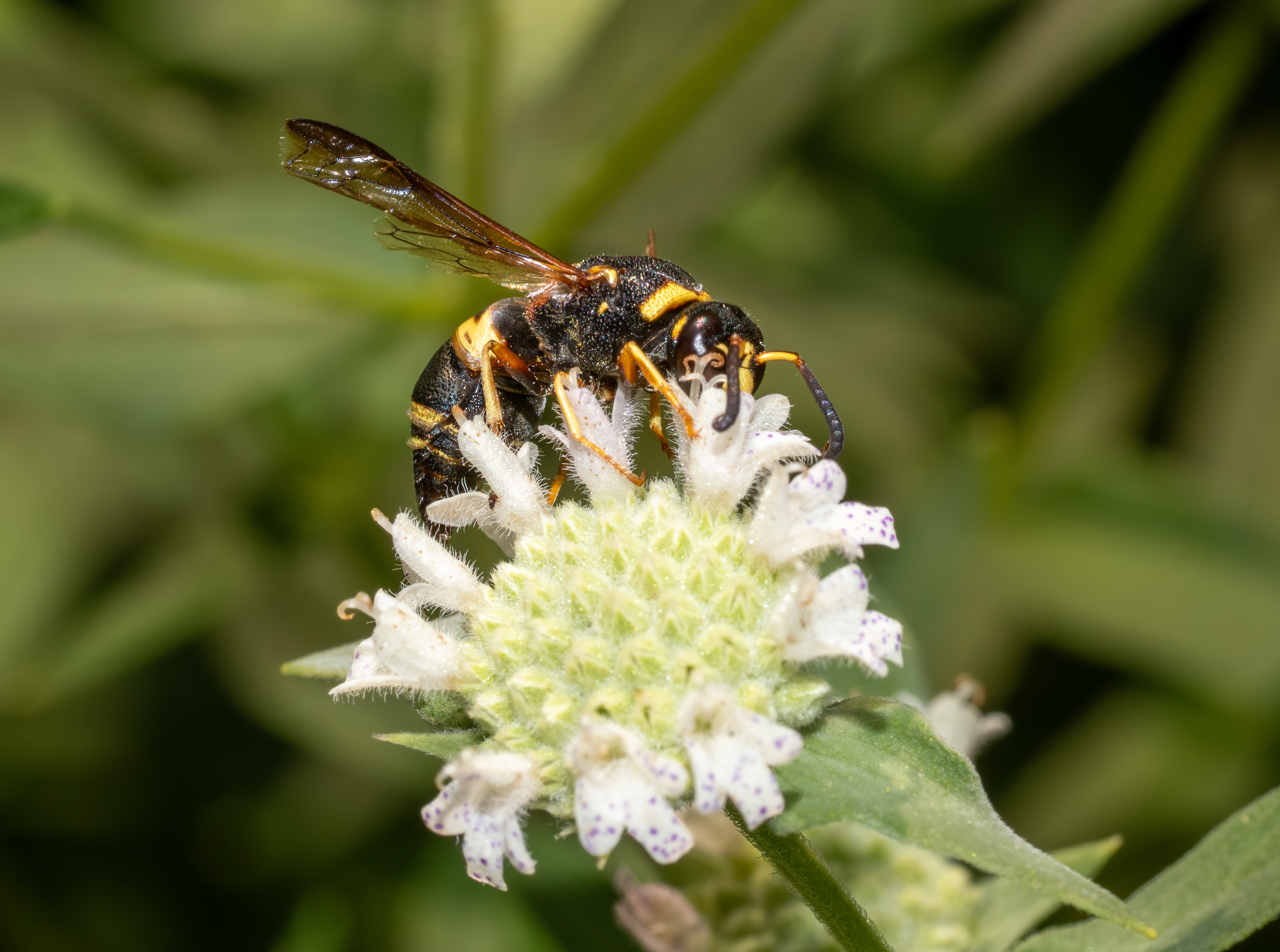
E. hidalgo on mountain mint

Euodynerus hidalgo is a species of potter wasp in the family Vespidae. It is distributed in North America.

== Subspecies ==
- Euodynerus hidalgo boreoorientalis (Bequaert, 1937)
- Euodynerus hidalgo hidalgo
- Euodynerus hidalgo viereckii (Cameron, 1909)
