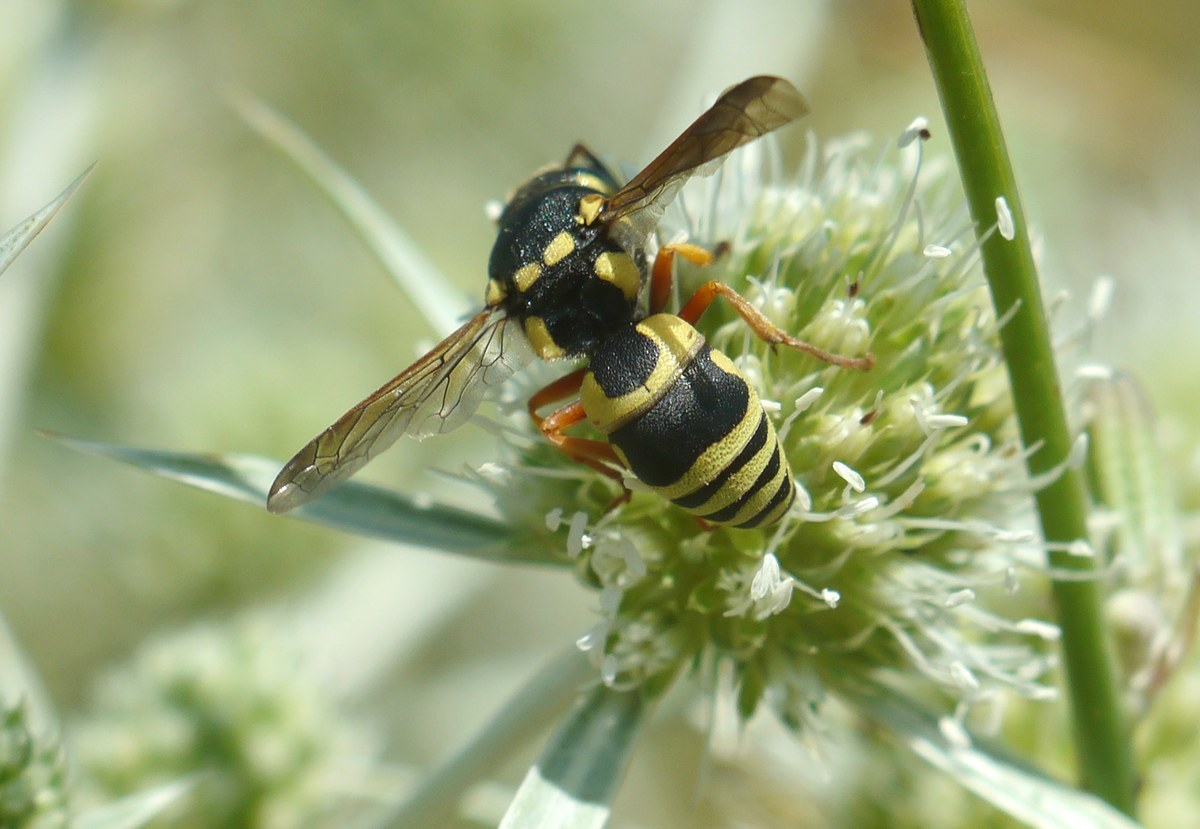

Scientific classification
- Domain: Eukaryota
- Kingdom: Animalia
- Phylum: Arthropoda
- Class: Insecta
- Order: Hymenoptera
- Family: Vespidae
- Genus: Euodynerus
- Species: E. dantici

Binomial name
- Euodynerus dantici (Rossi, 1790)

Synonyms
- Vespa dantici Rossi 1790; Odynerus postscutellatus Lepeletier, 1841; Euodynerus iberogallicus Bluethgen 1942; Odynerus lagostae Giordani Soika, 1942

= Euodynerus dantici =

Species of wasp

Euodynerus dantici is a species of potter wasps in the family Vespidae. This widespread species is present in most of Europe, in the East Palearctic ecozone, in the Near East, in the Neotropical Region, in North Africa and in the Oriental Region.
