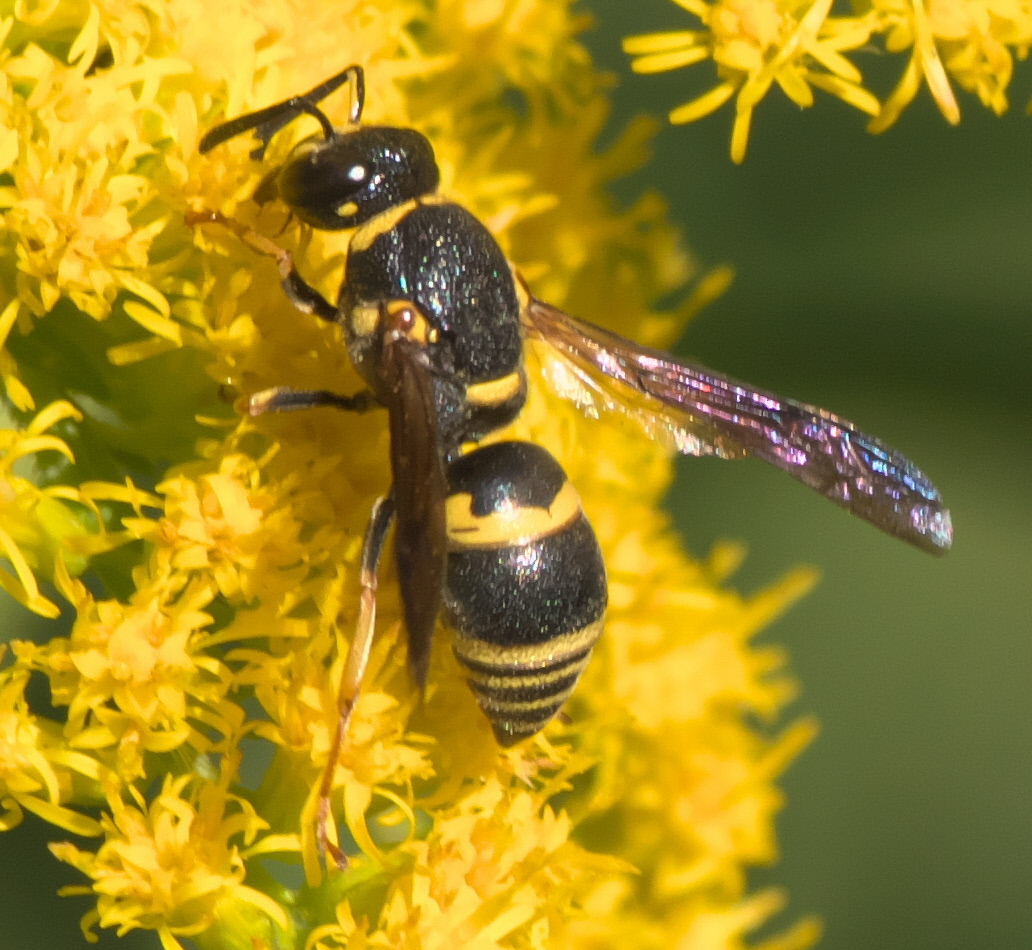

Scientific classification
- Domain: Eukaryota
- Kingdom: Animalia
- Phylum: Arthropoda
- Class: Insecta
- Order: Hymenoptera
- Family: Vespidae
- Genus: Euodynerus
- Species: E. foraminatus

Binomial name
- Euodynerus foraminatus (de Saussure, 1853)

= Euodynerus foraminatus =

Species of wasp

Euodynerus foraminatus is a species of potter or mason wasp in the family Vespidae. It is notable as a hymenopteran with fertile diploid males.
