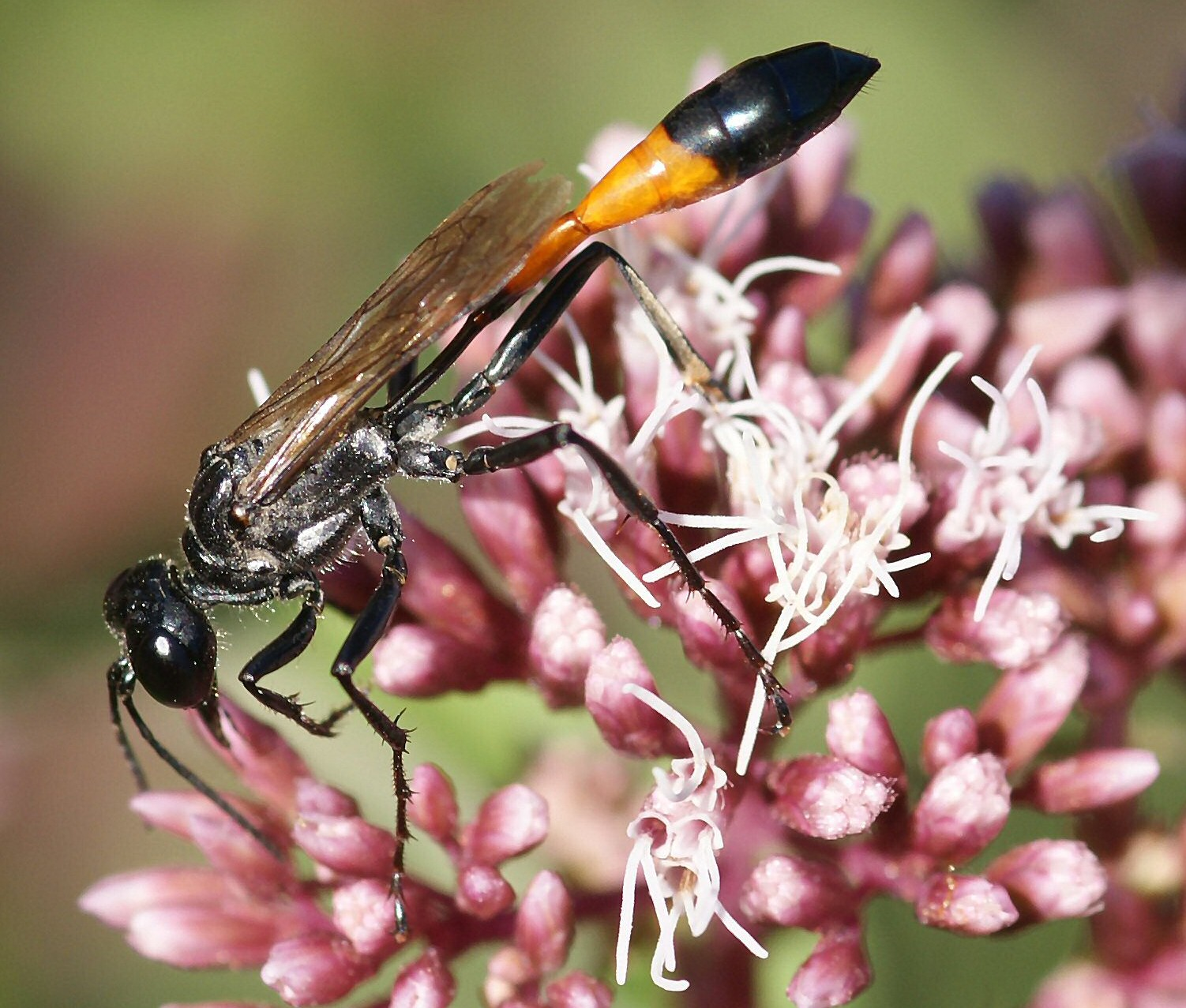
- Ammophila sabulosa taking nectar on a hemp agrimony flower head

Scientific classification
- Kingdom: Animalia
- Phylum: Arthropoda
- Class: Insecta
- Order: Hymenoptera
- Family: Sphecidae
- Genus: Ammophila
- Species: A. sabulosa

Binomial name
- Ammophila sabulosa (Linnaeus, 1758)

Synonyms
- Sphex sabulosa Linnaeus, 1758

= Ammophila sabulosa =

Species of wasp

Ammophila sabulosa, the red-banded sand wasp, is a species of the subfamily Ammophilinae of the solitary hunting wasp family Sphecidae, also called digger wasps. Found across Eurasia, the parasitoid wasp is notable for the mass provisioning behaviour of the females, hunting caterpillars mainly on sunny days, paralysing them with a sting, and burying them in a burrow with a single egg. The species is also remarkable for the extent to which females parasitise their own species, either stealing prey from nests of other females to provision their own nests, or in brood parasitism, removing the other female's egg and laying one of her own instead.

== Taxonomy ==
The species was first described by the Swedish taxonomist Carl Linnaeus as Sphex sabulosa in 1758. The genus Ammophila was created by the English parson-naturalist William Kirby in 1798.

It was formerly thought that the following were subspecies:

- Ammophila vagabunda F. Smith, 1856, (includes Ammophila sabulosa solowiyofkae Matsumura, 1911, a junior synonym)
- Ammophila touareg Ed. André, 1886

== Distribution ==
Ammophila sabulosa is widely distributed across Eurasia with records from the southern half of Britain, France, the Netherlands, Germany, Austria, Italy. Hungary, Poland, Norway, Sweden and Finland, further south in Turkey and Iran, then ranging eastwards as far as the Russian Far East, with a very few records in India and Japan.

== Description ==
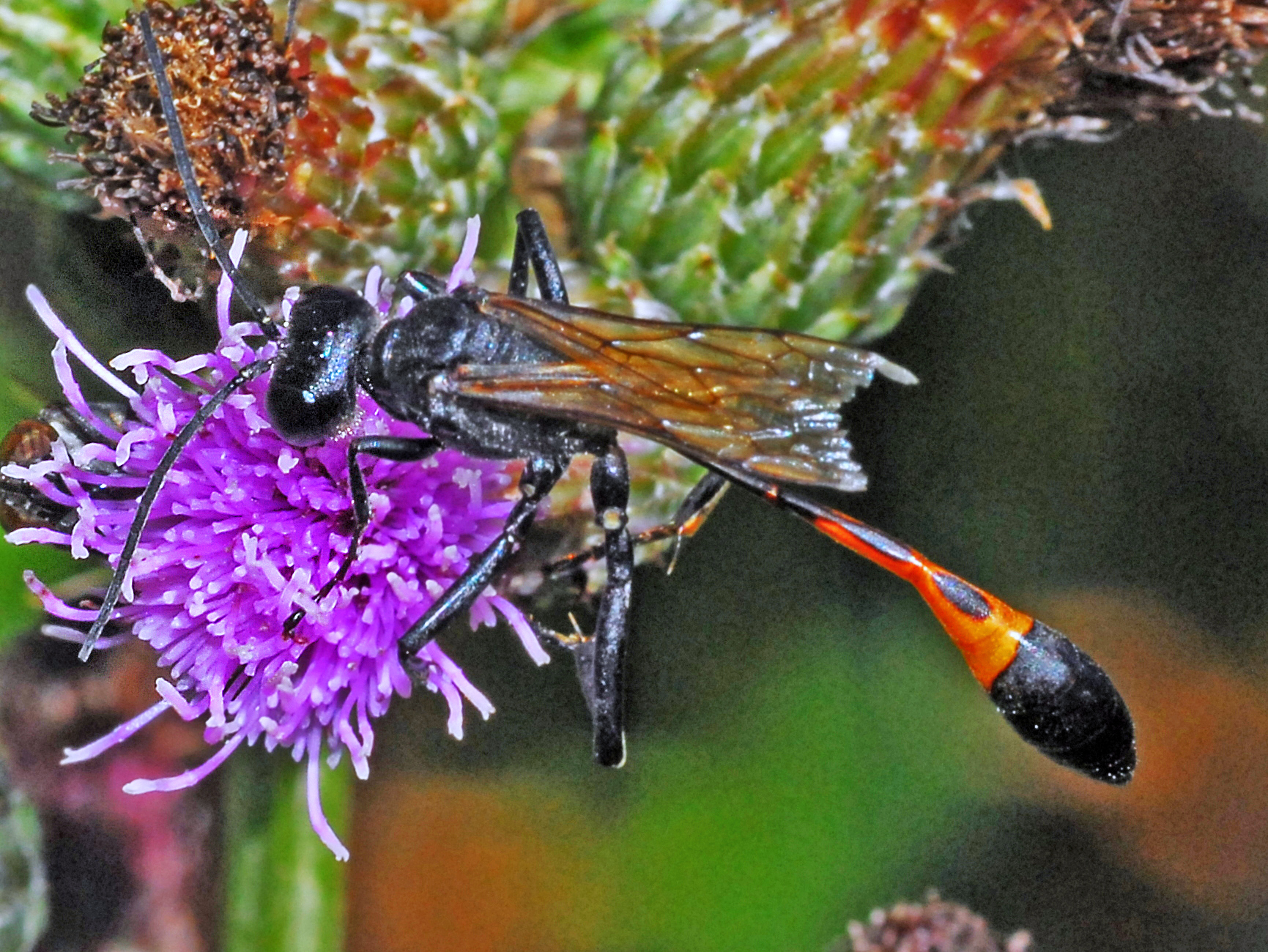
Male showing black spots on the first two tergites

Ammophila sabulosa is a large (15–25 mm or 0.59–0.98 in long) and striking solitary hunting wasp with a very long narrow "waist" of two segments. The body is black except for the front half of the "tail", which is orange.

The species can be told from A. pubescens (which is smaller, 12–20 mm or 0.47–0.79 in long) as the waist widens out very gradually into the "tail" of the abdomen. The pattern of the forewings also differs: the third submarginal cell makes broad contact with the cell to its front. Another difference is that the rear end of the abdomen has a faint metallic blue sheen.

== Behaviour ==
Video of Ammophila sabulosa provisioning a burrow with a single large caterpillar, and camouflaging it

Video of "RED BANDED SAND WASP (Ammophila sabulosa) CARRYING A CATERPILLAR"

The adults fly in summer on heathland and sandy places where the soil is soft enough for the female to dig burrows. The females are parasitoids, spending much of their time hunting for caterpillars. Sphecid wasps may begin by finding caterpillar faeces; parasitoid wasps are attracted by multiple substances, some volatile and some not, and the non-volatile cairohormones are found in caterpillar secretions and faeces. The captured caterpillars are always hairless, and are mostly Noctuids (owlet moths) or Geometrids (geometer moths, inchworms). The wasp grabs the upper (dorsal) side of the caterpillar, and angles her long abdomen around under the caterpillar to sting it on its lower (ventral) side, paralyzing it. The caterpillar remains alive, so that the wasp larvae will have fresh food to eat. The female digs burrows in sandy ground, provisions each burrow with a food supply of paralyzed caterpillars, and lays one egg, always on the first caterpillar to go into the burrow. The prey is stung several times, mainly on the 2nd and 3rd abdominal segments: this distribution may relate to the positions of nerve ganglia that co-ordinate locomotion in the caterpillar. Eggs are laid mainly on the 3rd and 4th abdominal segments.

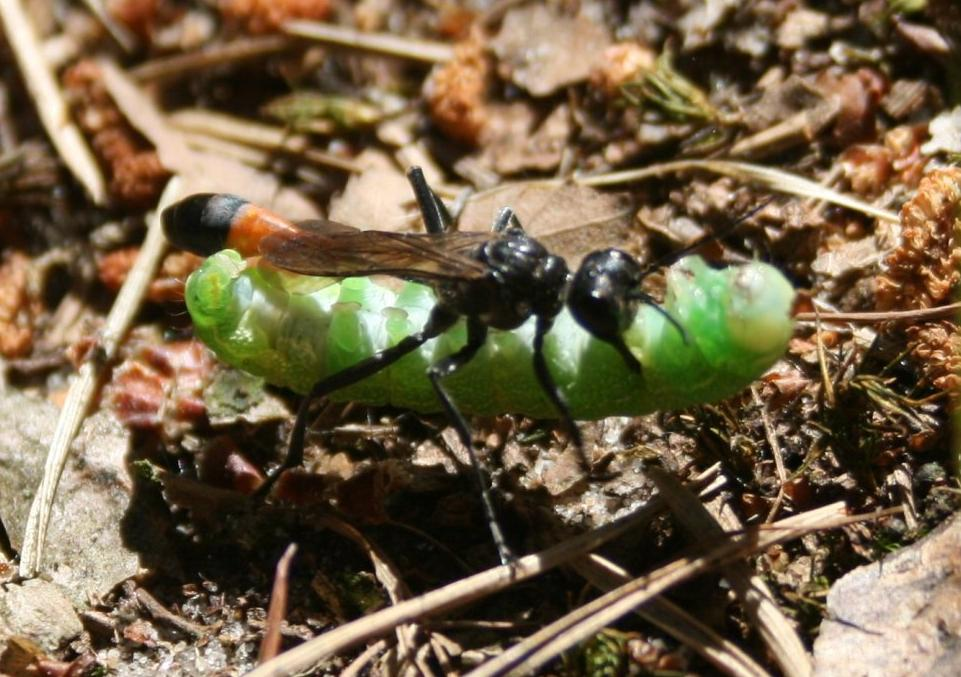
Ammophila sabulosa carrying a caterpillar to provision a nest

A female may make up to ten nests, one at a time (unlike A. pubescens where the female prepares multiple nests at once); most of the nests are provided with one large caterpillar, and the rest with two to five smaller caterpillars. Either way, the total prey volume is roughly 350 mm^{3}. Each nest is a short burrow some 2.5–4.5 centimetres (0.98–1.77 in) long, with an ovoidal brood-cell about 2–4 centimetres (0.79–1.57 in) long at the end. The burrow is sealed with stones, twigs or pieces of earth and then covered with sand. The female camouflages the nest with debris such as pine needles and pebbles unless the surface in the area is bare sand. Females are normally active only in direct sunlight. Nests are nearly always mass provisioned, which means fully stocked with enough food to take the wasp larva through to pupation, and then permanently closed.

=== Brood parasitism ===
Females often parasitise their own species, either stealing prey (kleptoparasitism) from nests of other females to provision their own nests, or in brood parasitism, removing the other female's egg and laying one of her own instead. Brood parasitism "appears to be a cheap and easy route to producing offspring", as it takes only about 30 minutes to switch eggs in an existing nest, but about 10 hours to build and provision a new nest; however, more than 80% of brood-parasitised nests were themselves parasitised by another female.

== Parasites ==
Ammophila sabulosa is parasitised by some other wasps including the Ichneumonid Buathra tarsoleuca and the Sphecid Podalonia affinis. A Strepsipteran (twisted-wing) parasite Paraxenos sphecidarum has been recorded in Belarus.
