= Ammophila =

Ammophila is the Latin name of two genera:

- Ammophila (plant), a genus of grasses in the family Poaceae
- Ammophila (wasp), a genus of insects in the family Sphecidae
