= Eremochares =

Scientific classification
- Kingdom: Animalia
- Phylum: Arthropoda
- Class: Insecta
- Order: Hymenoptera
- Family: Sphecidae
- Subfamily: Ammophilinae
- Genus: Eremochares; Gribodo, 1882

Type species
- Eremochares dives Brullé, 1833

Genus of wasps

Eremochares is a genus of wasps in the family Sphecidae.

== Species ==
The genus Eremochares contains 6 extant species:

- Eremochares clypevariatus Yan and Ma, 2015
- Eremochares dives (Brullé, 1833)
- Eremochares ferghanicus (Gussakovskij, 1930)
- Eremochares kohlii (Gussakovskij, 1928)
- Eremochares luteus (Taschenberg, 1869)
- Eremochares mirabilis (Gussakovskij, 1928)
