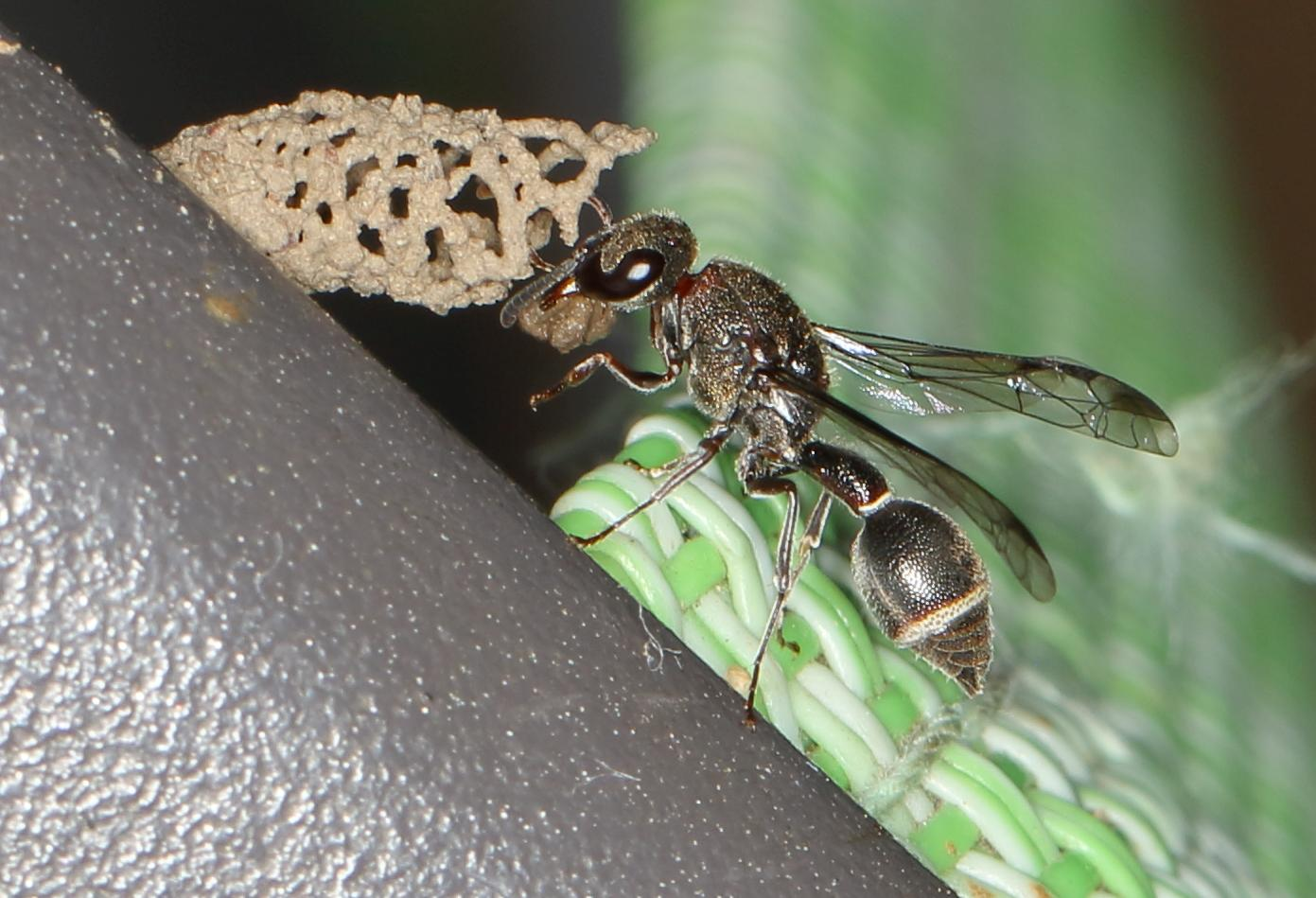
- Potter wasp (Pseudonortonia sp.)

Scientific classification
- Domain: Eukaryota
- Kingdom: Animalia
- Phylum: Arthropoda
- Class: Insecta
- Order: Hymenoptera
- Family: Vespidae
- Subfamily: Eumeninae
- Genus: Pseudonortonia; Giordani Soika, 1936

Type species
- Pseudonortonia difformis (Saussure, 1852)

Species
- See text

= Pseudonortonia =

Genus of wasps

Pseudonortonia is a fairly large genus of potter wasps with a rich Afrotropical fauna, as well as with several species which occur throughout the Palearctic and Indomalayan regions.

== Species ==
The following species are included in Pseudonortonia:

- Pseudonortonia abbreviaticornis Giordani Soika, 1941
- Pseudonortonia aberratica (Morice, 1903)
- Pseudonortonia accliva (Gusenleitner, 2007)
- Pseudonortonia aegyptiaca (Saussure, 1863)
- Pseudonortonia arida Giordani Soika, 1987
- Pseudonortonia arnoldi Giordani Soika, 1936
- Pseudonortonia aterrima Giordani Soika, 1989
- Pseudonortonia aurantiaca Giordani Soika, 1936
- Pseudonortonia barbara Giordani Soika, 1992
- Pseudonortonia bhamensis Giordani Soika, 1941
- Pseudonortonia bicarinata Guichard, 1986
- Pseudonortonia bisuturalis (Saussure, 1852)
- Pseudonortonia boranensis Giordani Soika, 1939
- Pseudonortonia braunsii (Kohl, 1906)
- Pseudonortonia bushirensis Giordani Soika, 1943
- Pseudonortonia caffra (Meade-Waldo, 1911)
- Pseudonortonia camarinensis Selis & Nguyen, 2024
- Pseudonortonia coniux Giordani Soika, 1983
- Pseudonortonia convexiuscula Giordani Soika, 1939
- Pseudonortonia depressa Giordani Soika, 1983
- Pseudonortonia difformis (Saussure, 1852)
- Pseudonortonia elongata Giordani Soika, 1941
- Pseudonortonia fischeri Giordani Soika, 1987
- Pseudonortonia flavolimbata Giordani Soika, 1986
- Pseudonortonia flavolineata Giordani Soika, 1983
- Pseudonortonia fragosa (Kohl, 1906)
- Pseudonortonia gambiensis(Meade-Waldo, 1911)
- Pseudonortonia gujaratica (Nurse, 1902)
- Pseudonortonia henrica (Cameron, 1908)
- Pseudonortonia incola Selis & Nguyen, 2024
- Pseudonortonia interiacens Giordani Soika, 1987
- Pseudonortonia kibonotensis (Cameron, 1910)
- Pseudonortonia kisangani (Bequaert, 1918)
- Pseudonortonia lamellata Selis & Nguyen, 2024
- Pseudonortonia leclercqi Giordani Soika, 1989
- Pseudonortonia lomholdti Giordani Soika, 1983
- Pseudonortonia maculinoda (Cameron, 1910)
- Pseudonortonia malelensis (Bequaert, 1918)
- Pseudonortonia morula (Kohl, 1906)
- Pseudonortonia omanensis Giordani Soika, 1979
- Pseudonortonia parvula(Saussure, 1852)
- Pseudonortonia pharao (Saussure, 1863)
- Pseudonortonia paulyi Giordani Soika, 1989
- Pseudonortonia rubrosignata Gusenleitner, 1992
- Pseudonortonia rufolineata (Cameron, 1905)
- Pseudonortonia rufoquadripustulata (Cameron, 1910)
- Pseudonortonia scotti Giordani Soika, 1957
- Pseudonortonia somala Giordani Soika, 1989
- Pseudonortonia soror (Kohl, 1906)
- Pseudonortonia sudanensis (Schulthess, 1920)
- Pseudonortonia tegulata Giordani Soika, 1989
- Pseudonortonia tenuis Gusenleitner, 2002
- Pseudonortonia tilkiani Guichard, 1986
- Pseudonortonia tricarinulata (Bequaert, 1918)
- Pseudonortonia uncinata Giordani Soika, 1989
- Pseudonortonia unicata (Giordani Soika, 1990)
- Pseudonortonia zairensis (Bequaert, 1918)
