= Ammophila poecilocnemis =

Scientific classification
- Kingdom: Animalia
- Phylum: Arthropoda
- Clade: Pancrustacea
- Class: Insecta
- Order: Hymenoptera
- Family: Sphecidae
- Genus: Ammophila
- Species: A. poecilocnemis

Binomial name
- Ammophila poecilocnemis Morice, 1900

Species of insect

Ammophila poecilocnemis is a species of wasp of the genus Ammophila, family Sphecidae.

== Taxonomy ==
It was described in 1900 by Francis David Morice.
