= A. juncea =

A. juncea may refer to:

- Achatinella juncea, an extinct snail
- Aeshna juncea, a hawker dragonfly
- Ammophila juncea, a thread-waisted wasp
- Anisacanthus juncea, a desert honeysuckle
- Anomatheca juncea, a southeastern African plant
- Aphyllanthes juncea, a Mediterranean plant
- Arenaria juncea, a plant with swollen stem nodes
- Armeria juncea, a sea pink
- Artemisia juncea, a herbaceous plant
