= Ammophila asiatica =

Scientific classification
- Kingdom: Animalia
- Phylum: Arthropoda
- Clade: Pancrustacea
- Class: Insecta
- Order: Hymenoptera
- Family: Sphecidae
- Genus: Ammophila
- Species: A. asiatica

Binomial name
- Ammophila asiatica Tsuneki, 1971

Species of wasp

Ammophila asiatica is a species of wasp of the genus Ammophila, family Sphecidae.

== Taxonomy ==
It was described in 1971 by Tsuneki.
