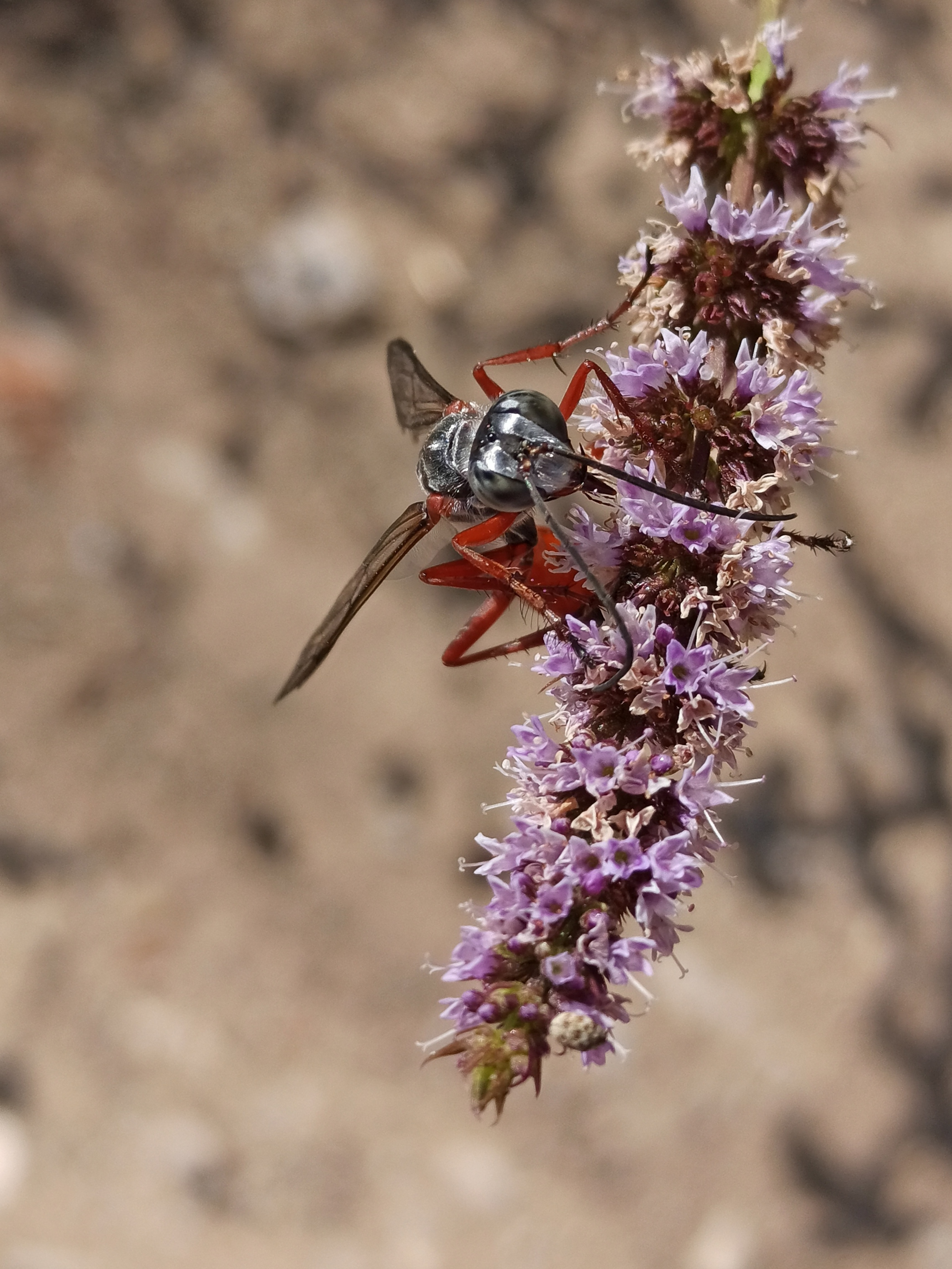

Scientific classification
- Kingdom: Animalia
- Phylum: Arthropoda
- Class: Insecta
- Order: Hymenoptera
- Family: Sphecidae
- Genus: Ammophila
- Species: A. rubripes

Binomial name
- Ammophila rubripes Spinola, 1839

= Ammophila rubripes =

Species of wasp

Ammophila rubripes is a species of hunting wasp found throughout Africa and the Middle-East.

== Description ==
Ammophila rubripes is mostly variable reddish-brown in color, with silvery-white setae covering much of the head and thorax. The gastral apex, or outer tip of the abdomen, is black

== Distribution ==
This species is found in Benin, Botswana, Burkina Faso, Ethiopia, the Central African Republic, Guinea, Kenya, Malawi, Mozambique, Namibia, Nigeria, South Africa, Tanzania, Uganda, Zambia, Zimbabwe, Jordan, Israel, Syria, the Arabian Peninsula, and Morocco.
