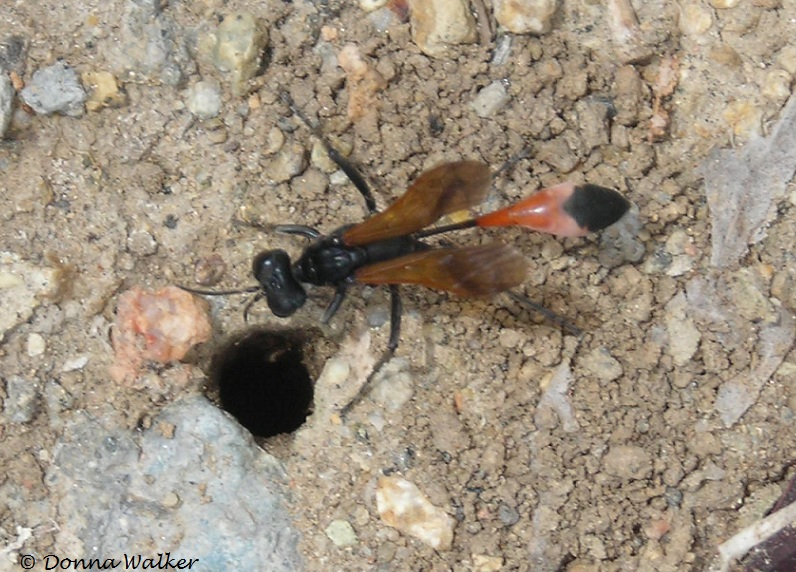

Scientific classification
- Kingdom: Animalia
- Phylum: Arthropoda
- Clade: Pancrustacea
- Class: Insecta
- Order: Hymenoptera
- Family: Sphecidae
- Genus: Ammophila
- Species: A. ferrugineipes

Binomial name
- Ammophila ferrugineipes Lepeletier de Saint Fargeau, 1845

Synonyms
- Ammophila meruensis Cameron, 1908; Ammophila curvistriata Cameron, 1908; Ammophila erythrospila Cameron, 1905; Ammophila dunbrodyensis Cameron, 1905

= Ammophila ferrugineipes =

Species of insect

Ammophila ferrugineipes is a species of wasp of the genus Ammophila, family Sphecidae.
