= Ammophila aphrodite =

Scientific classification
- Kingdom: Animalia
- Phylum: Arthropoda
- Class: Insecta
- Order: Hymenoptera
- Family: Sphecidae
- Genus: Ammophila
- Species: A. aphrodite

Binomial name
- Ammophila aphrodite Menke, 1964

Species of wasp

Ammophila aphrodite is a species of thread-waisted wasp in the family Sphecidae. It is native to the southwest United States.

Its body is entirely reddish-orange.
