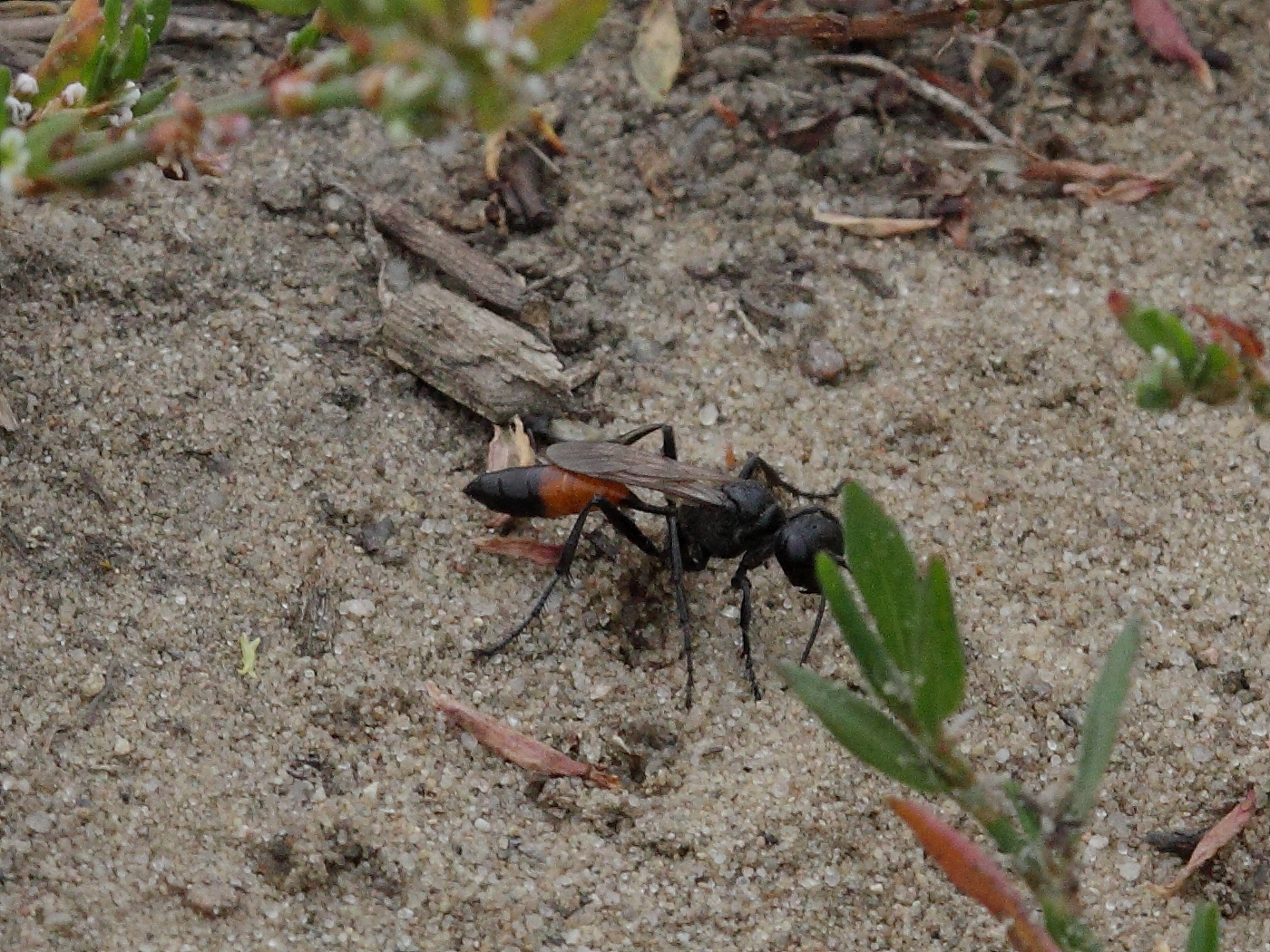

Scientific classification
- Domain: Eukaryota
- Kingdom: Animalia
- Phylum: Arthropoda
- Class: Insecta
- Order: Hymenoptera
- Family: Sphecidae
- Subfamily: Ammophilinae
- Genus: Podalonia
- Species: P. affinis

Binomial name
- Podalonia affinis (W. Kirby 1798)

= Podalonia affinis =

Species of wasp

Podalonia affinis is a Palearctic species of thread-waisted wasp.
