= Ammophila confusa =

Scientific classification
- Kingdom: Animalia
- Phylum: Arthropoda
- Clade: Pancrustacea
- Class: Insecta
- Order: Hymenoptera
- Family: Sphecidae
- Genus: Ammophila
- Species: A. confusa

Binomial name
- Ammophila confusa A. Costa, 1864

Species of wasp

Ammophila confusa is a species of wasp of the genus Ammophila, family Sphecidae.

== Taxonomy ==
It was found for the first time in 1964 by A. Costa.
