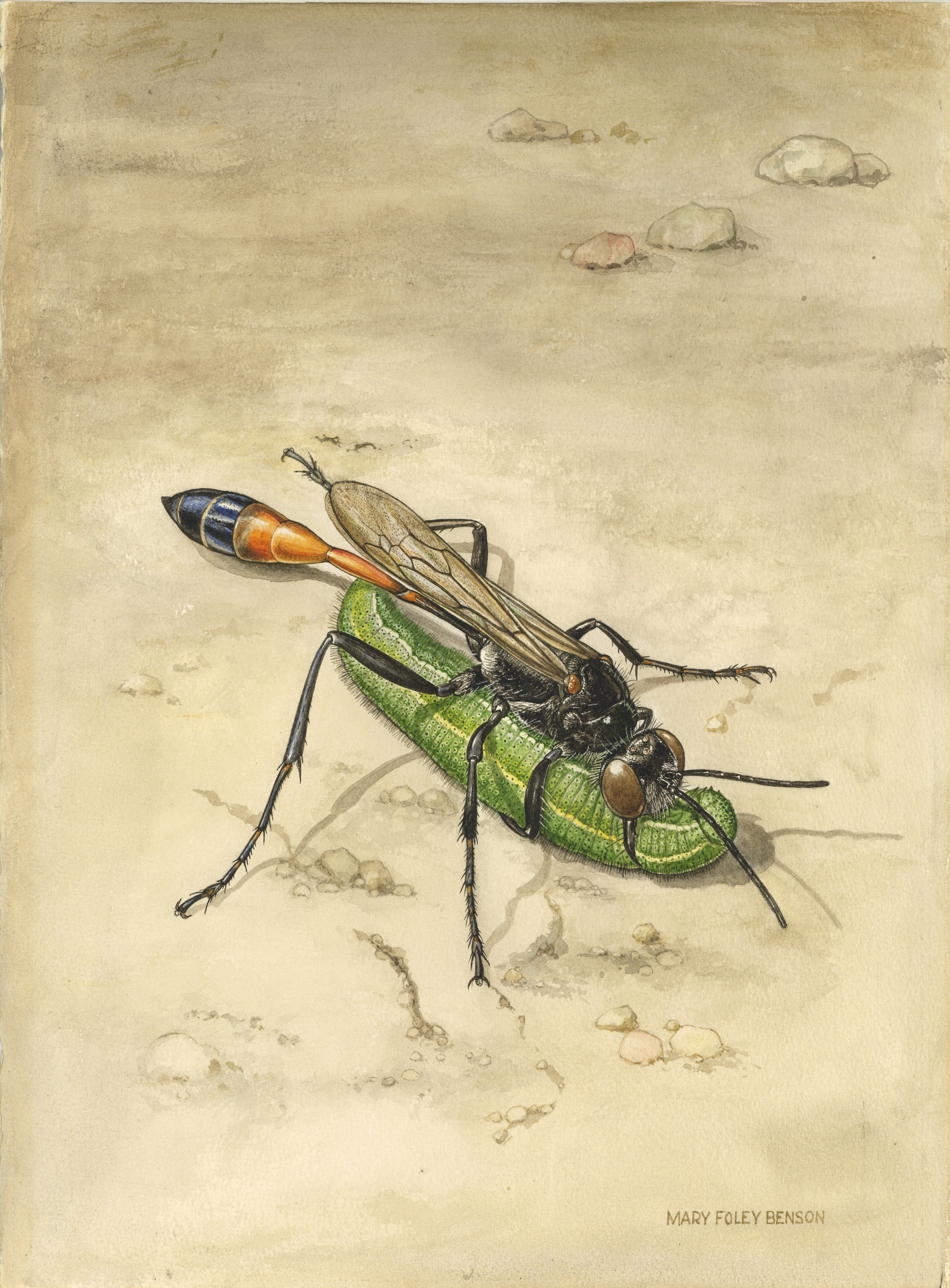

Scientific classification
- Kingdom: Animalia
- Phylum: Arthropoda
- Class: Insecta
- Order: Hymenoptera
- Family: Sphecidae
- Genus: Ammophila
- Species: A. azteca

Binomial name
- Ammophila azteca Cameron, 1888

Synonyms
- Ammophila pilosa brevisericea Murray in Muesebeck et al., 1951; Sphex aculeatus Fernald, 1934; Sphex pilosus Fernald, 1934; Sphex pilosus nudus Murray, 1938

= Ammophila azteca =

Species of wasp

Ammophila azteca is a species of thread-waisted wasp in the family Sphecidae. It is native to Canada, Mexico, and the continental United States. It is found from near-sea level to over 6,000 feet in altitude.

== Nesting ==
Like other Ammophila wasps, Ammophila azteca digs its nest, provisions it with the larvae of another species, lays its egg, and fills it in with earth.

Ammophila azteca digs in moderately firm soil.

The female is the one who cares for the young, and may dig multiple in quick succession, hunting for multiple larvae concurrently.

After finishing digging its nest, it will close the tunnel by placing a pebble or other hard lump at the entrance. This will often be accompanied by scraping sand over the pebble. At this point, the wasp will begin to hunt. After it has retrieved the first prey and laid its egg, it will make a different temporary closure which it will open and close over the following days as it brings more prey into the nest. This temporary closure involves a pebble or lump stuck halfway down the tunnel or further, after which the wasp will use its head to pack in soil above it. This takes anywhere from thirty seconds to two minutes. Removing it takes much less time.

When returning its prey back to the nest, Ammophila azteca flies about a meter off the ground.

The egg hatches after two days, and feeds for five days before maturing into a cocoon. The female closes the nest for the final time when the larva is nearly mature.

The final closure of the nest is very similar to the temporary closures, but may differ in that the initial pebble is placed further down, it spends more time packing in the soil, and it holds a pebble while it packs in soil.

== Subspecies ==
These two subspecies belong to the species Ammophila azteca:

- Ammophila azteca azteca Cameron, 1888
- Ammophila azteca clemente Menke, 1967
