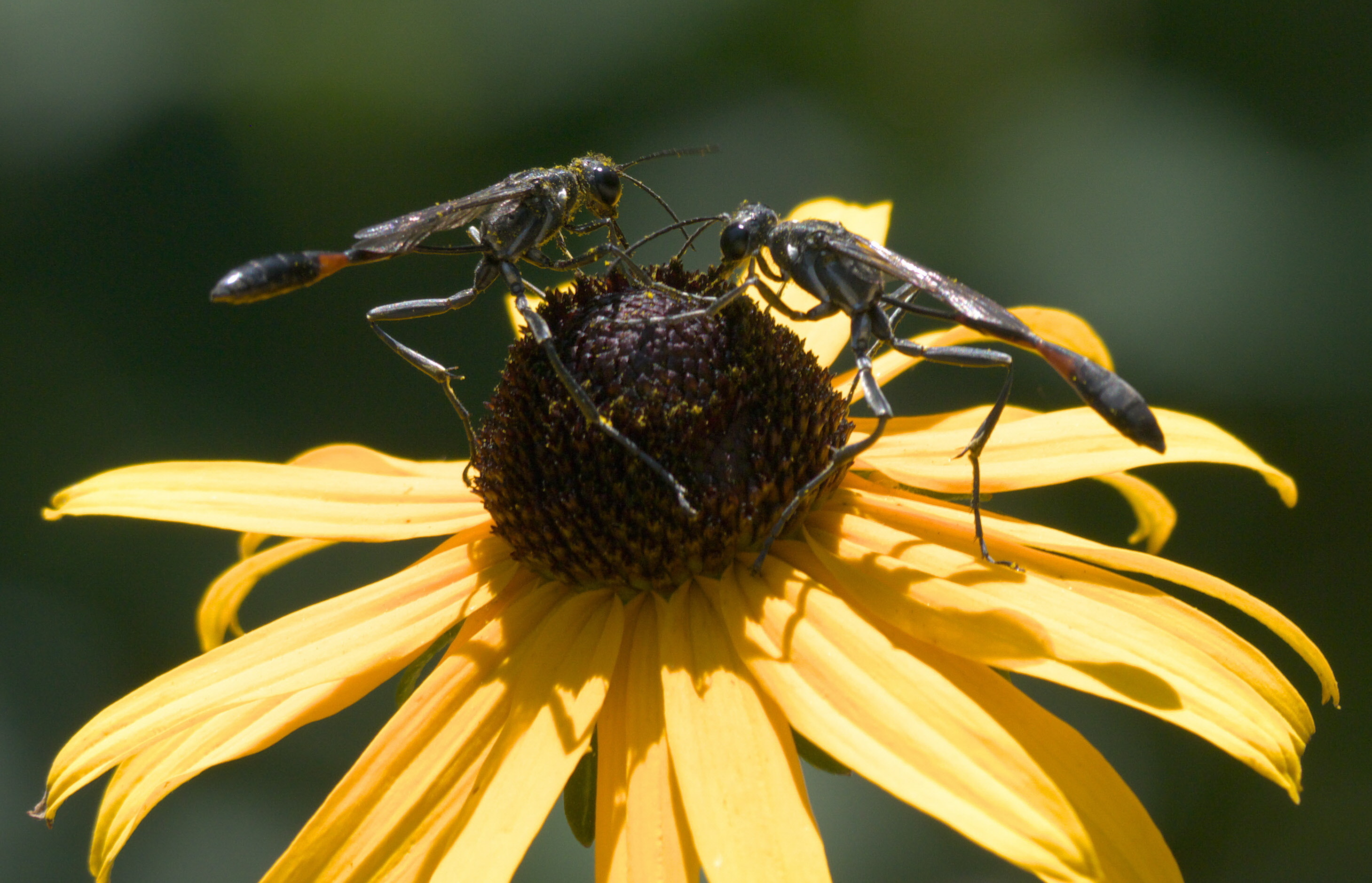

Scientific classification
- Kingdom: Animalia
- Phylum: Arthropoda
- Class: Insecta
- Order: Hymenoptera
- Family: Sphecidae
- Genus: Ammophila
- Species: A. procera

Binomial name
- Ammophila procera Dahlbom, 1843

Synonyms
- Ammophila barbata F. Smith, 1873; Ammophila ceres Cameron, 1888; Ammophila championi Cameron, 1888; Ammophila gryphus F. Smith, 1856; Ammophila saeva F. Smith, 1856; Ammophila striolata Cameron, 1888

= Ammophila procera =

Species of wasp

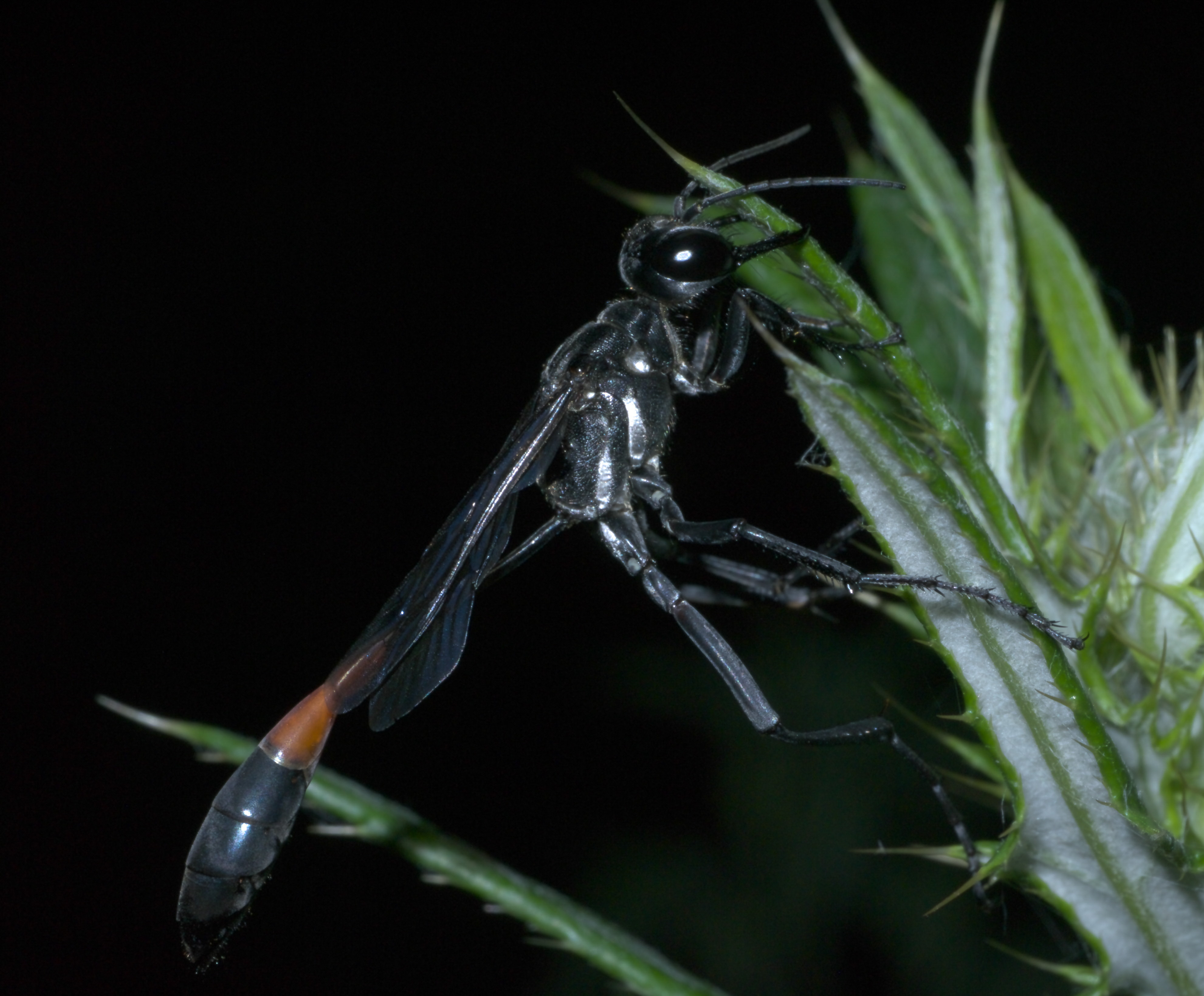
Common thread-waisted wasp, Ammophila procera

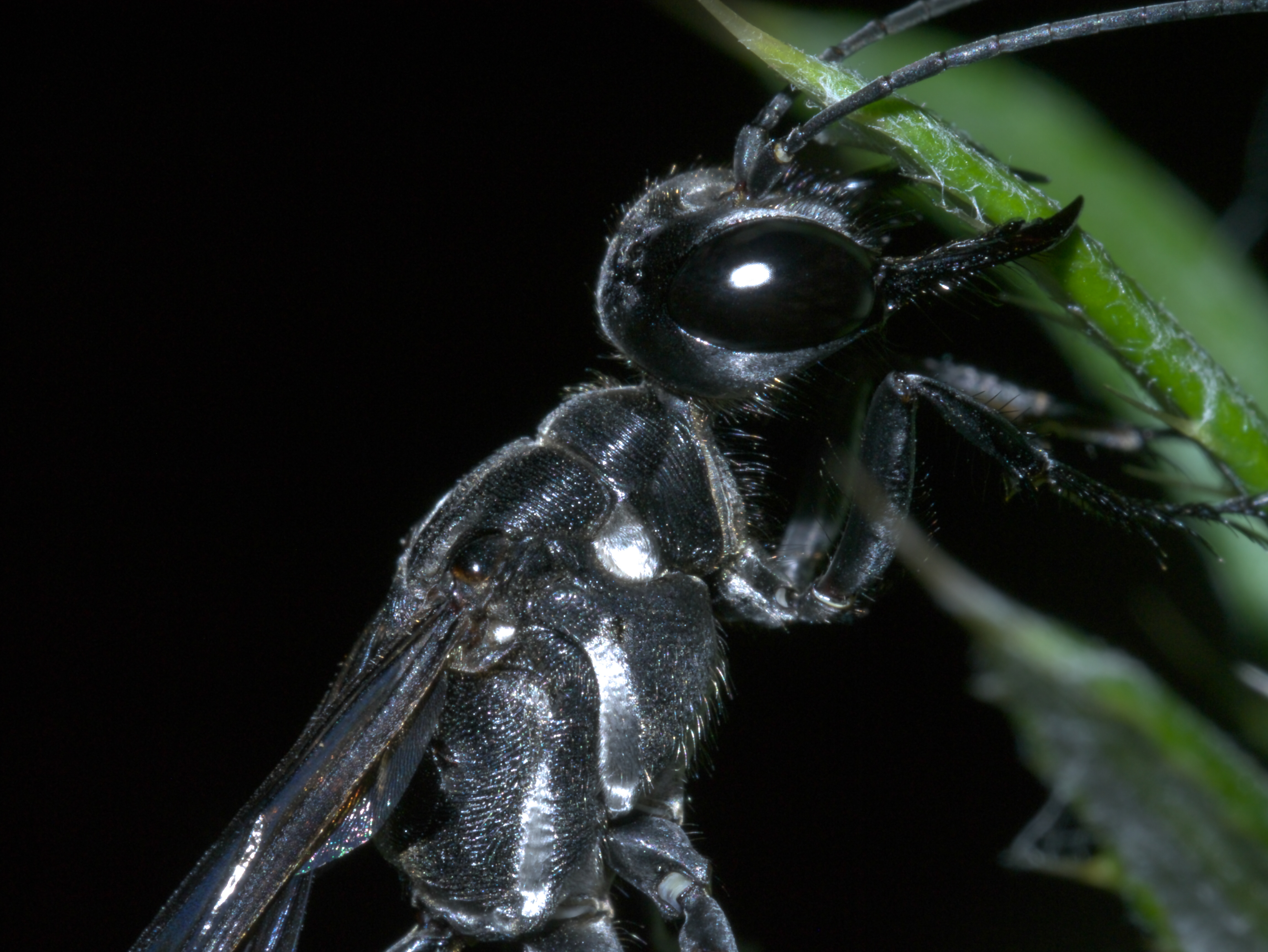
Common thread-waisted wasp, Ammophila procera

Ammophila procera, the common thread-waisted wasp, is a species of thread-waisted wasp in the family Sphecidae. It is a common species, found in southern Canada, the United States, and Mexico, and south to Central America.

Ammophila procera generally live in open areas with soft or sandy soil where they can burrow nests. The adult female digs a burrow. After completing the burrow, it seals the entrance and makes flight around the area, memorizing landmarks such as rocks, plants, etc. It uses these landmarks to locate the burrow when it returns, sometimes days later.

It then captures and paralyzes prey, usually a moth caterpillar or sawfly larva, and drags it to the burrows where it lays a single egg on the prey. The female then seals the nest with dirt and debris. Despite sealing the nest, some females will "hijack" another's nest, replacing the egg in the nest with their own.

The egg typically hatches after two days, and the larva feeds on the caterpillar for about five days before it pupates within the nest. It emerges from the nest with fully formed wings. The adults feed primarily on flower nectar.
