= Ammophila instabilis =

Scientific classification
- Kingdom: Animalia
- Phylum: Arthropoda
- Clade: Pancrustacea
- Class: Insecta
- Order: Hymenoptera
- Family: Sphecidae
- Genus: Ammophila
- Species: A. instabilis

Binomial name
- Ammophila instabilis F. Smith, 1856

Synonyms
- Ammophila impatiens F. Smith, 1868

Species of wasp

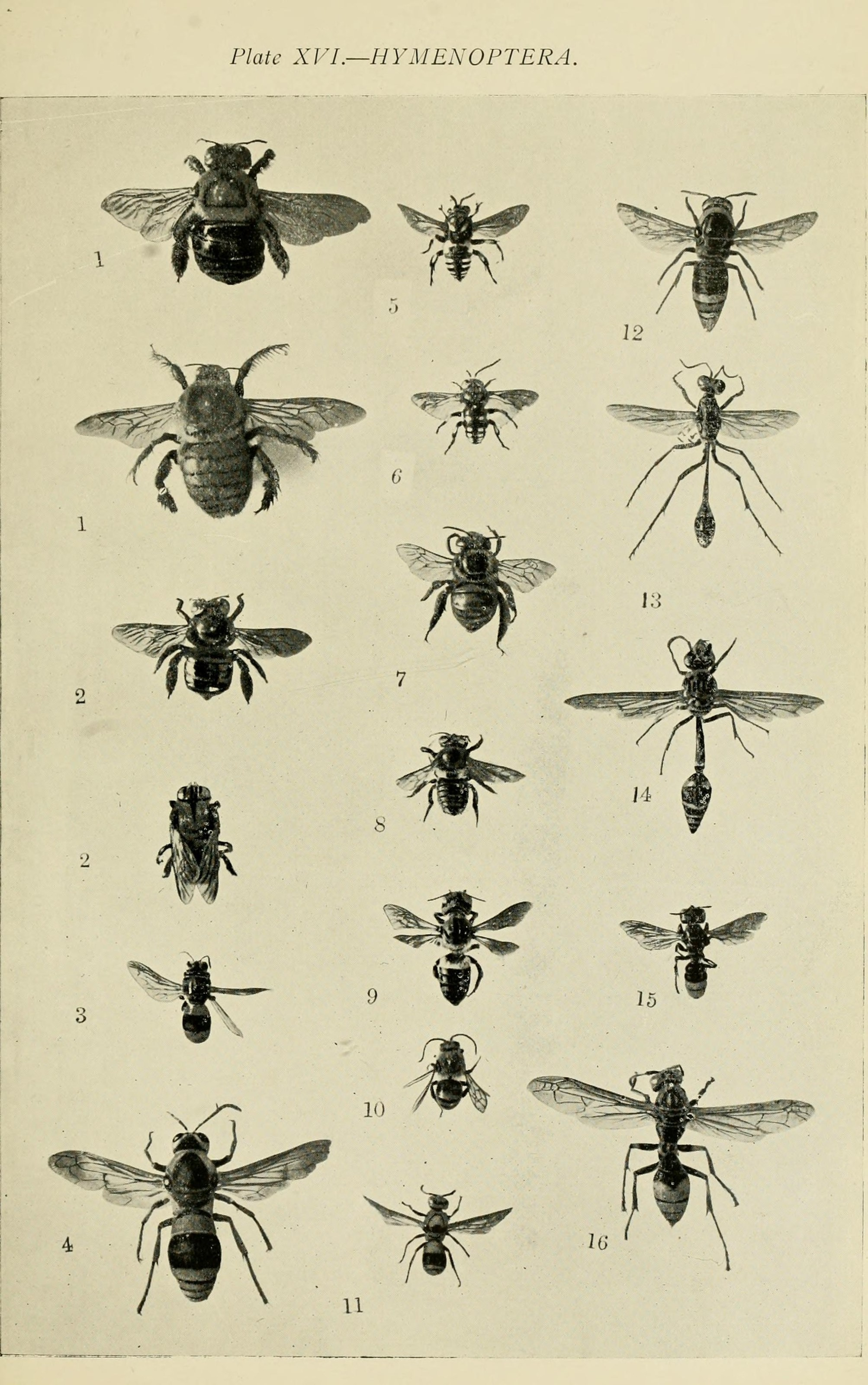
Australian Insects (Plate XVI), where No. 13 is Ammophila impatiens = Ammophila instabilis (formerly Sphegidae, now Sphecidae)

Ammophila instabilis is a species of wasp of the genus Ammophila, family Sphecidae.

== Taxonomy ==
It was described in 1856 by F. Smith.
