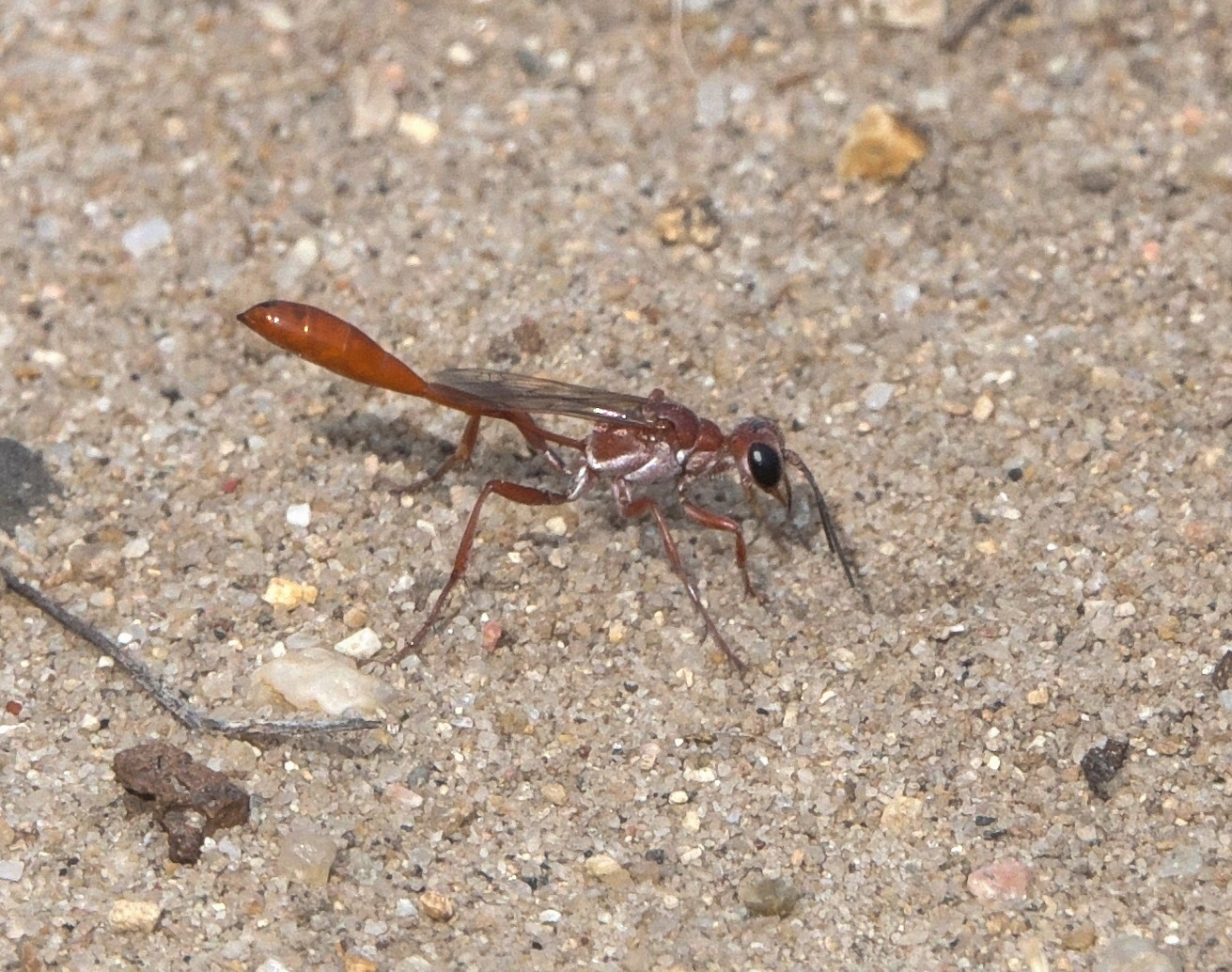
- Ammophila ferruginosa, Colorado

Scientific classification
- Kingdom: Animalia
- Phylum: Arthropoda
- Class: Insecta
- Order: Hymenoptera
- Family: Sphecidae
- Genus: Ammophila
- Species: A. ferruginosa

Binomial name
- Ammophila ferruginosa Cresson, 1865

Synonyms
- Ammophila collaris Cresson, 1865; Sphex cressoni H. Smith, 1908

= Ammophila ferruginosa =

Species of wasp

Ammophila ferruginosa is a species of thread-waisted wasp in the family Sphecidae, found in North America.
