= Ammophila aberti =

Scientific classification
- Kingdom: Animalia
- Phylum: Arthropoda
- Clade: Pancrustacea
- Class: Insecta
- Order: Hymenoptera
- Family: Sphecidae
- Genus: Ammophila
- Species: A. aberti

Binomial name
- Ammophila aberti Haldeman, 1852

Synonyms
- Ammophila tarsata F. Smith, 1856; Ammophila yarrowi Cresson, 1875; Sphex transversus Fernald, 1934

Species of wasp

Ammophila aberti is a species of thread-waisted wasp in the family Sphecidae.

== Distribution ==
It is found in western and central North America, from southern Canada to Mexico, in open, semi-arid locations.

== Mating ==
The male rides on the female's back, using his mandibles to hold onto the back of her head. The female must move her abdomen upwards for them to copulate successfully.

== Nesting ==
The female of this species digs its nest in firm sand or muddy areas. While digging, the wasp emits a buzz that can be heard from over four meters away. It flies the soil it excavates away from the burrow.

Tunnels are several centimeters long, usually straight, sometimes slightly curved or angled. The round cell at the bottom of the tunnel is 18–20 mm in diameter.

Ammophila aberti prey on geometrid larvae, providing up to 10 for a nest. Gathering enough prey for their larvae takes over two days. During this time it will temporarily close the entrance, open it to deposit prey, and then close it again. This temporary closure is achieved by pulling a pebble over the opening and pushing sand over it. After the nest has been fully provisioned, the wasp will close the burrow again by jamming pebbles inside it and kicking the dirt or sand down. Sometimes it will only use dirt or sand. Once the fill material has reached the surface, it will use a rock or some other hard material to press down the dirt.
