= Ammophila eyrensis =

Scientific classification
- Kingdom: Animalia
- Phylum: Arthropoda
- Clade: Pancrustacea
- Class: Insecta
- Order: Hymenoptera
- Family: Sphecidae
- Genus: Ammophila
- Species: A. eyrensis

Binomial name
- Ammophila eyrensis R. Turner, 1908

Species of wasp

Ammophila eyrensis is a species of wasp in the family Sphecidae that was described in 1908. It is native to eastern Australia.
