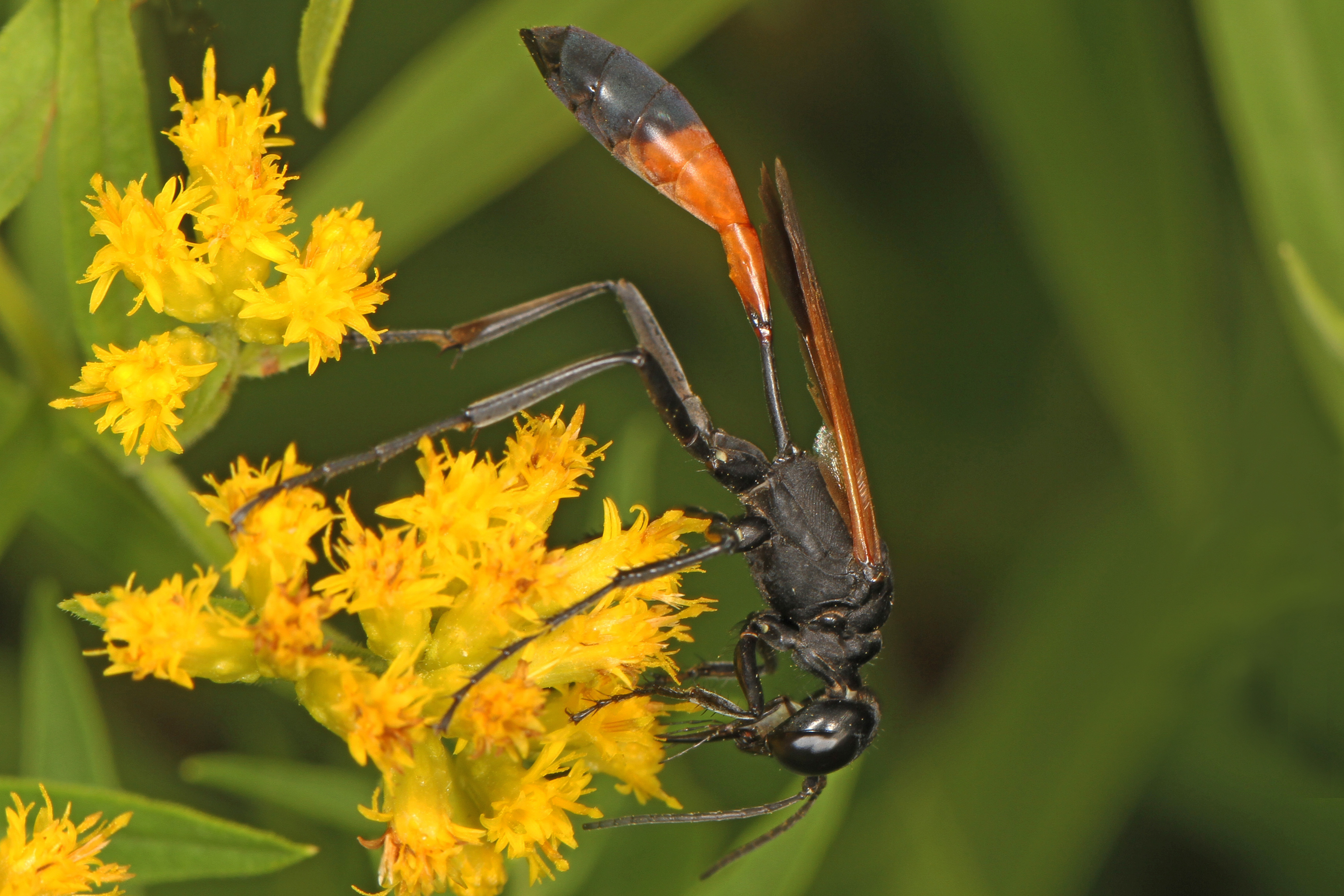
- Ammophila pictipennis, Virginia

Scientific classification
- Kingdom: Animalia
- Phylum: Arthropoda
- Class: Insecta
- Order: Hymenoptera
- Family: Sphecidae
- Genus: Ammophila
- Species: A. pictipennis

Binomial name
- Ammophila pictipennis Walsh, 1869

Synonyms
- Ammophila anomala Taschenberg, 1869; Sphex nigropilosus Rohwer, 1912

= Ammophila pictipennis =

Species of wasp

Ammophila pictipennis is a species of thread-waisted wasp in the family Sphecidae, found in the eastern half of North America.

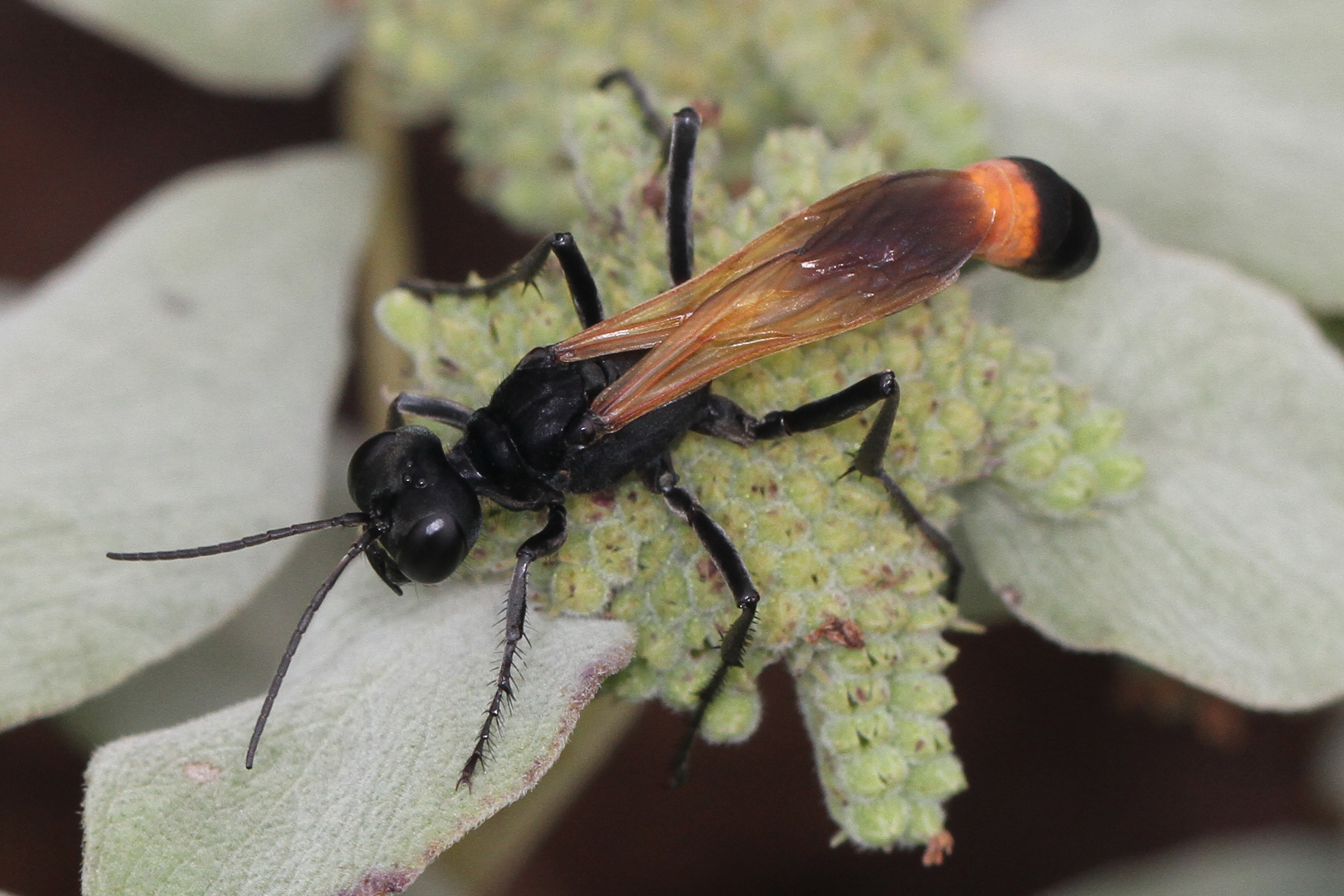
Ammophila pictipennis, Virginia
