= Ammophila deserticola =

Scientific classification
- Kingdom: Animalia
- Phylum: Arthropoda
- Clade: Pancrustacea
- Class: Insecta
- Order: Hymenoptera
- Family: Sphecidae
- Genus: Ammophila
- Species: A. deserticola

Binomial name
- Ammophila deserticola Tsuneki, 1971

Species of insect

Ammophila deserticola is a species of thread-waisted wasp in the family Sphecidae.
