= Ammophila djaouak =

Scientific classification
- Kingdom: Animalia
- Phylum: Arthropoda
- Clade: Pancrustacea
- Class: Insecta
- Order: Hymenoptera
- Family: Sphecidae
- Genus: Ammophila
- Species: A. djaouak

Binomial name
- Ammophila djaouak de Beaumont, 1956

Species of wasp

Ammophila djaouak is a species of wasp of the genus Ammophila, family Sphecidae.

== Taxonomy ==
It was described in 1956 by Jacques de Beaumont.
