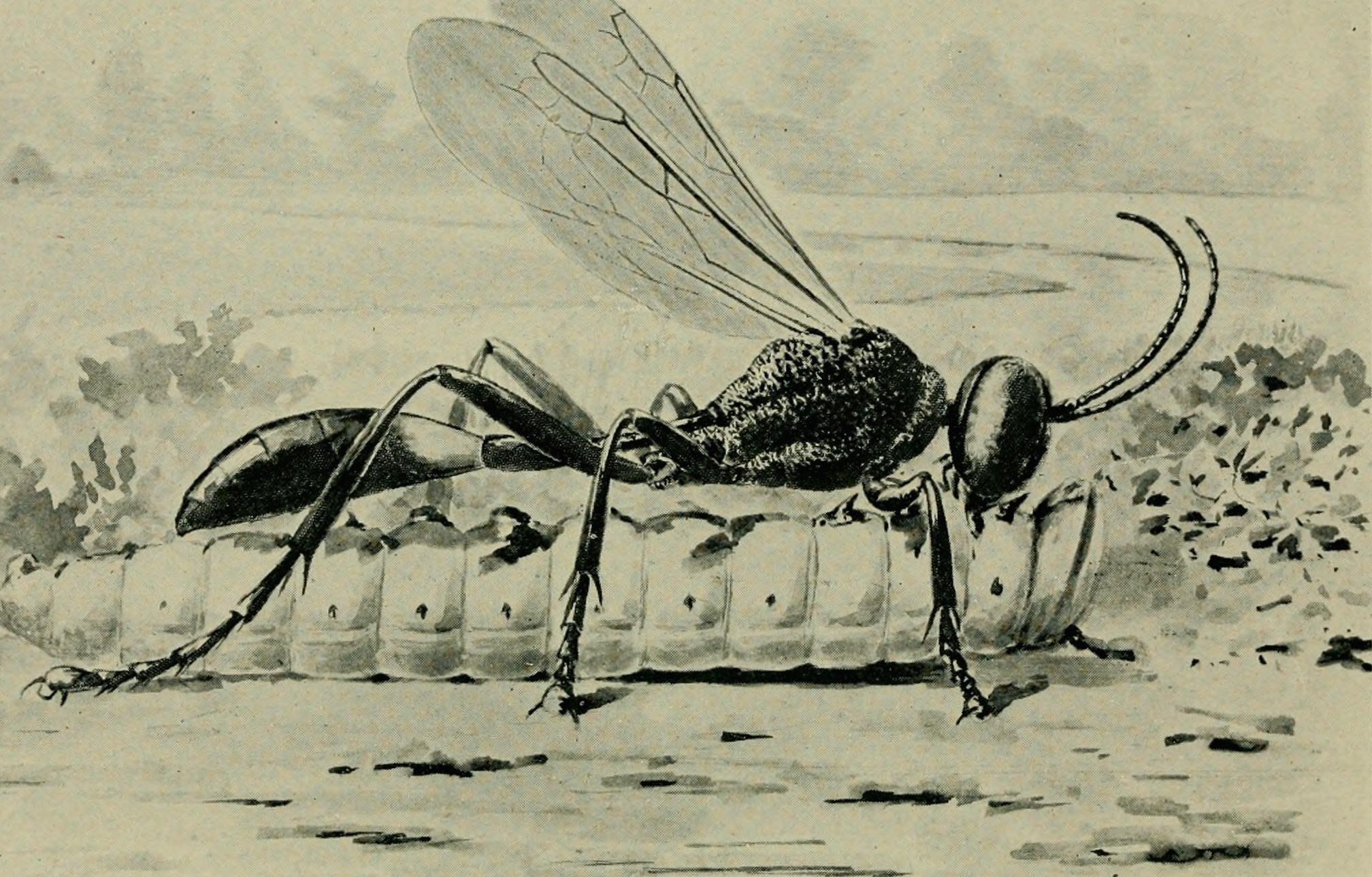

Scientific classification
- Kingdom: Animalia
- Phylum: Arthropoda
- Clade: Pancrustacea
- Class: Insecta
- Order: Hymenoptera
- Family: Sphecidae
- Genus: Ammophila
- Species: A. urnaria

Binomial name
- Ammophila urnaria Dahlbom, 1843

Synonyms
- Ammophila inepta Cresson, 1873; Sphex floridensis Fernald, 1934

= Ammophila urnaria =

Species of wasp

Ammophila urnaria is a species of hunting wasp in the family Sphecidae. It is a black and red insect native to the eastern United States. It feeds on nectar but catches and paralyses caterpillars to leave in underground chambers for its developing larvae to consume.

== Description ==
Ammophila urnaria is a small wasp about 2.5 cm (1 in) long with a slender body. It is black apart from a band of red around the front portion of its abdomen.

== Distribution ==
Ammophila urnaria is native to the eastern part of North America in locations including Nova Scotia, South Carolina and St John's Bluff in eastern Florida.

== Behaviour ==
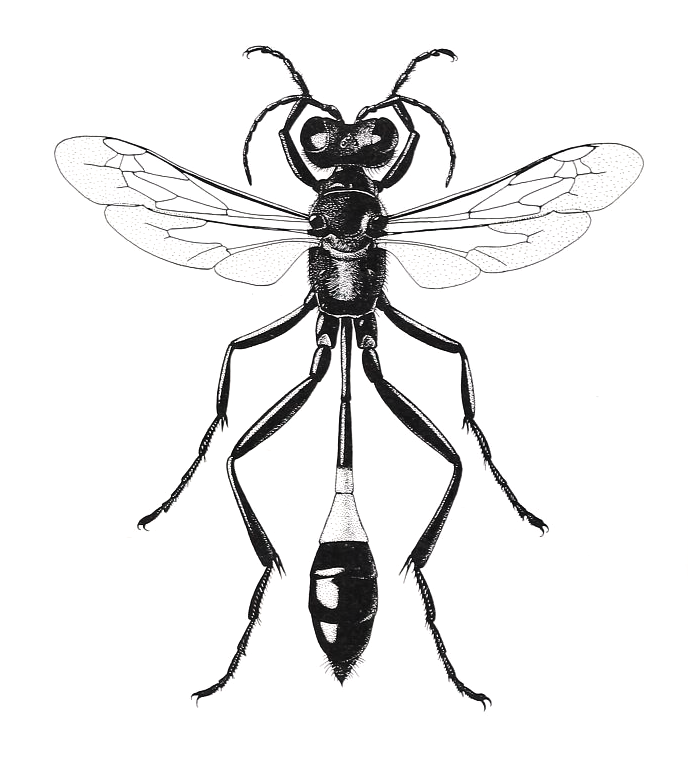

Ammophila urnaria feeds on nectar and can often be seen on the flower heads of sorrel or onion. The breeding season is in summer. The female wasp digs a succession of burrows in sandy soil, provisioning each burrow with one or more paralysed caterpillars, lays an egg on the first caterpillar in each and seals the hole. The caterpillars in each burrow should provide sufficient nourishment to allow the larva that hatches from the egg to grow and pupate. Some wasps are kleptoparasites. They may open the nests of other A. urnaria wasps, remove their eggs and lay their own on the caterpillars stored there. Some have also been observed to parasitise the nest burrows of other species of wasp, Ammophila kennedyi and Podalonia robusta.

George and Elizabeth Peckham were American ethologists and entomologists and described in 1898 how they watched a female A. urnaria wasp provisioning her burrow. She ran along the ground among purslane plants until she found a small green caterpillar which she paralysed with a sting. She carried this heavy burden through their garden and out into an adjoining field of maize. Although all the cornstalks look similar to the Peckhams, the wasp quickly located the right spot and laid the caterpillar down. She then moved two fragments of soil which had been concealing the entrance to a hole. Picking up the caterpillar, she reversed into the burrow dragging the caterpillar behind her and disappeared from view. They could not see what happened next but knew she was laying an egg beside the caterpillar.

They later observed another A. urnaria wasp knock a caterpillar off a bean plant onto bare ground. The caterpillar writhed and struggled to escape, rolling and unrolling itself, and the wasp had difficulty getting hold of it. She eventually straddled it, grasped it with her mandibles, lifted it off the ground and curled her abdomen underneath. It continued to struggle but she managed to insert her sting into the junction between the third and fourth segments. At once the caterpillar became motionless and limp and she was able to sting it twice more, choosing the underside junctions between segment two and three and then between segments one and two. After a brief pause and circling flight she stung it again several times in joints in the posterior part of its body. On another occasion they saw a female wasp hammering the ground firm over the entrance to a burrow with a small pebble and reported what they thought was the first observation of an insect using a tool. They were unable to observe this behaviour again but later discovered that Samuel Wendell Williston had recorded similar behaviour in the wasp Ammophila yarrowi in 1892. Since then, several species of Ammophila have been observed to move dry soil, particles of grit, male pine cones and other suitable size fragments into their burrows, push these objects down with their heads, add more, pound the surface of the ground with chips of wood or fine pebbles and leave it smooth and level. The fact that these other wasp species also use tools makes it likely that this behaviour evolved a long time ago in a common ancestor.
