= Ammophila lativalvis =

Scientific classification
- Kingdom: Animalia
- Phylum: Arthropoda
- Class: Insecta
- Order: Hymenoptera
- Family: Sphecidae
- Genus: Ammophila
- Species: A. lativalvis

Binomial name
- Ammophila lativalvis Gussakovskij, 1928

Species of wasp

Ammophila lativalvis is a species of wasp of the genus Ammophila, family Sphecidae.

== Taxonomy ==
It was first found in 1928 by Gussakovskij.
