= Ammophila striata =

Scientific classification
- Kingdom: Animalia
- Phylum: Arthropoda
- Clade: Pancrustacea
- Class: Insecta
- Order: Hymenoptera
- Family: Sphecidae
- Genus: Ammophila
- Species: A. striata

Binomial name
- Ammophila striata Mocsáry, 1878

Species of wasp

Ammophila striata is a species of wasp of the genus Ammophila, family Sphecidae.

== Taxonomy ==
It was described in 1878 by Moscráy.
