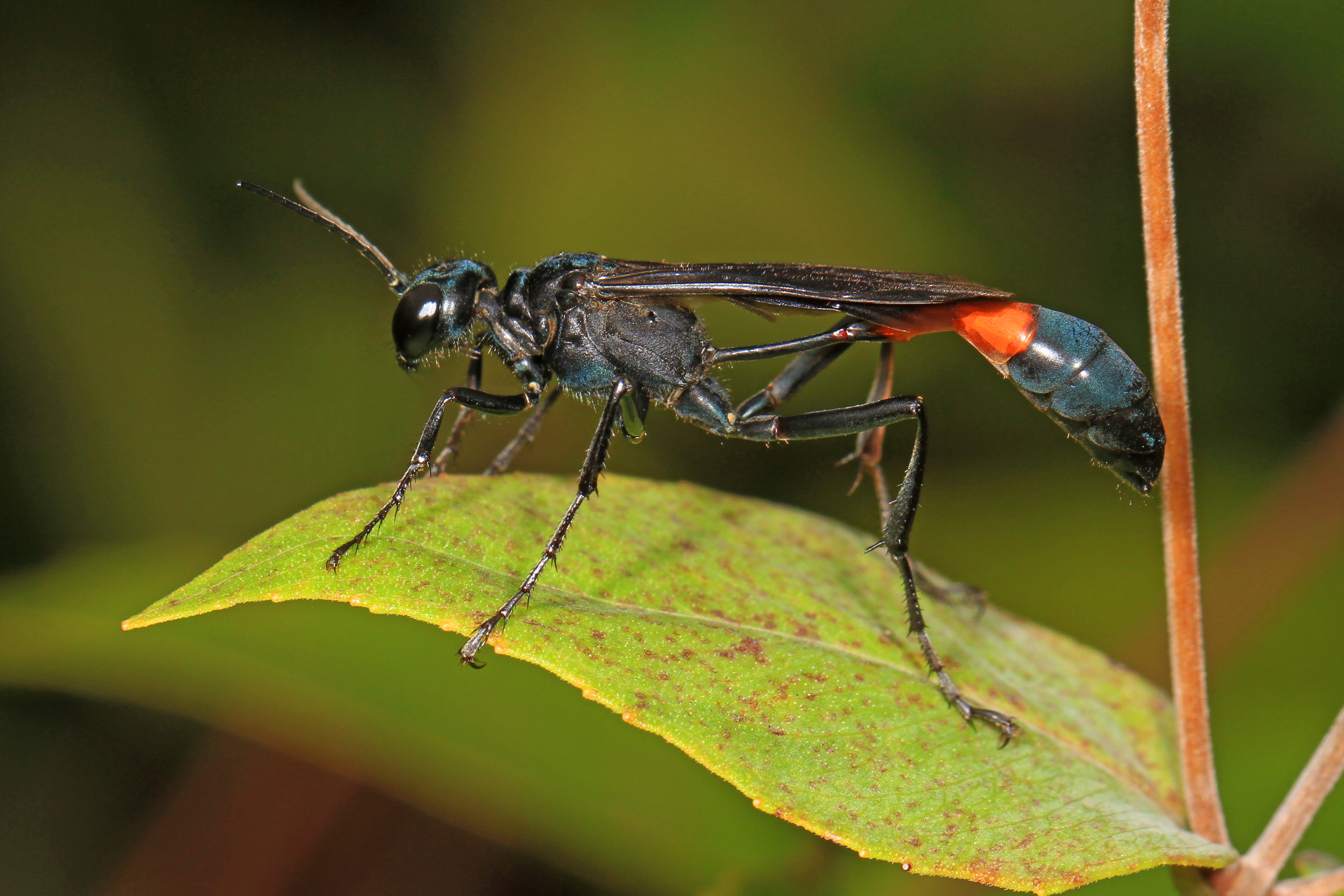

Scientific classification
- Kingdom: Animalia
- Phylum: Arthropoda
- Class: Insecta
- Order: Hymenoptera
- Family: Sphecidae
- Genus: Ammophila
- Species: A. nigricans

Binomial name
- Ammophila nigricans Dahlbom, 1843

Synonyms
- Ammophila intercepta Lepeletier de Saint Fargeau, 1845

= Ammophila nigricans =

Species of wasp

Ammophila nigricans is a species of thread-waisted wasp in the family Sphecidae.
