= Ammophila femurrubra =

Scientific classification
- Kingdom: Animalia
- Phylum: Arthropoda
- Class: Insecta
- Order: Hymenoptera
- Family: Sphecidae
- Genus: Ammophila
- Species: A. femurrubra

Binomial name
- Ammophila femurrubra W. Fox, 1894

Species of wasp

Ammophila femurrubra is a species of thread-waisted wasp in the family Sphecidae. It is native to the southwest United States and Mexico.

There is no significant research on this species. One entomologist observed it to behave in ways typical of the Ammophila genus.
