= Ammophila rubiginosa =

Scientific classification
- Kingdom: Animalia
- Phylum: Arthropoda
- Clade: Pancrustacea
- Class: Insecta
- Order: Hymenoptera
- Family: Sphecidae
- Genus: Ammophila
- Species: A. rubiginosa

Binomial name
- Ammophila rubiginosa Lepeletier de Saint Fargeau, 1845

Species of wasp

Ammophila rubiginosa is a species of wasp of the genus Ammophila, family Sphecidae.

== Taxonomy ==
It was described for the first time in 1845 by Saint Fargeau.
