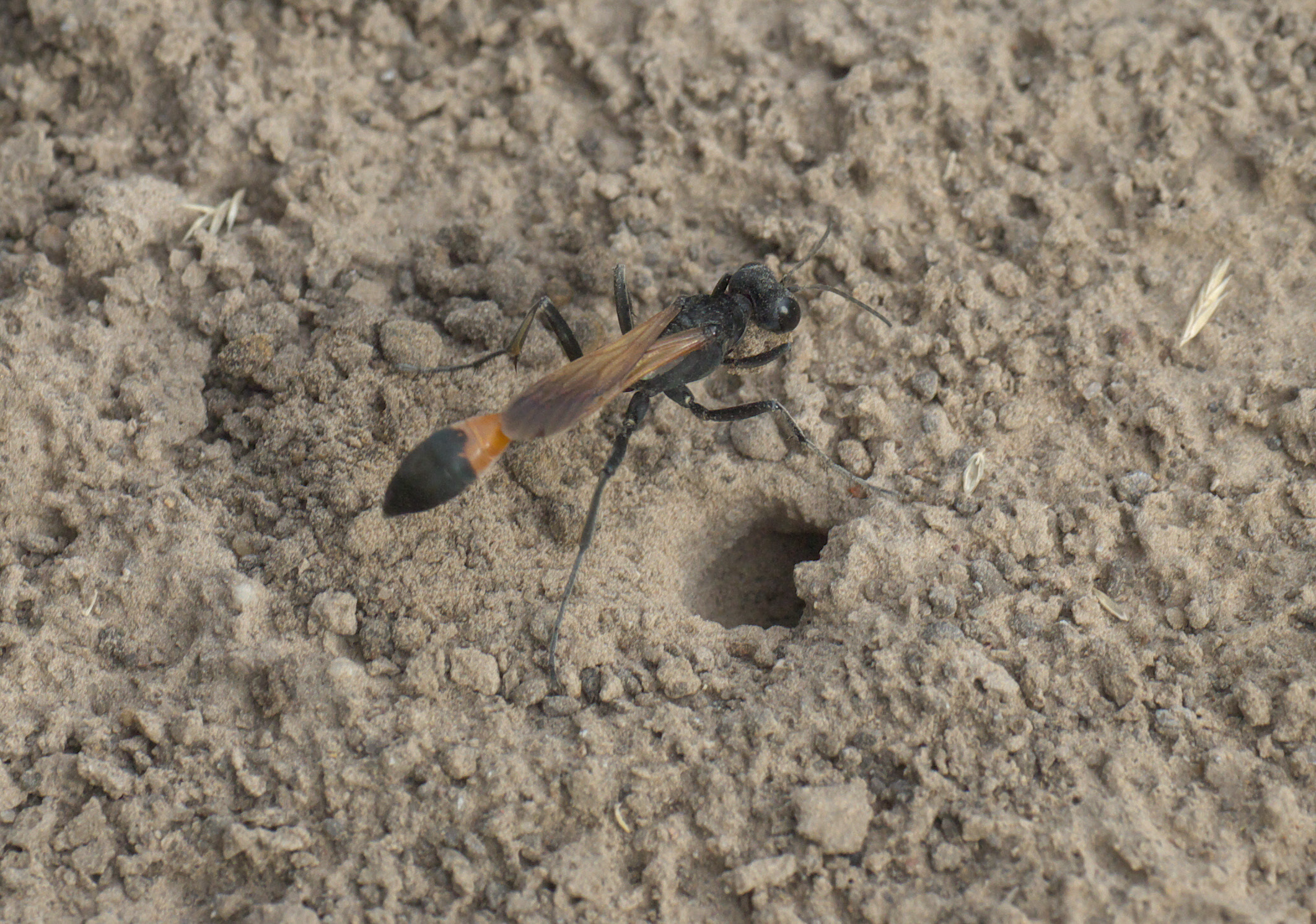

Scientific classification
- Kingdom: Animalia
- Phylum: Arthropoda
- Class: Insecta
- Order: Hymenoptera
- Family: Sphecidae
- Genus: Ammophila
- Species: A. placida

Binomial name
- Ammophila placida F. Smith, 1856

= Ammophila placida =

Species of wasp

Ammophila placida is a species of thread-waisted wasp in the family Sphecidae. It is found in the continental United States and Central America.

== Nesting ==
The female of Ammophila placida digs its nest in relatively firm soil. The process of making one happens over the course of a day or longer. It begins by digging a vertical or nearly vertical burrow, that ends four to ten centimeters down with a horizontal cell. The cell is about two and a half centimeters. The excavated dirt is scattered 30–50 cm away from its nest. Most often Ammophila placida will fly low to the ground to transport the dirt, but rarely it may walk.

Once it has built the cell, it has been observed to bring anywhere from one to five caterpillars back to it. It lays its egg on the first caterpillar it brings back to the nest.

Ammophila placida has been observed to prey upon caterpillars from the families Noctuidae, Hesperiidae, and Geometridae.

Closing a burrow takes approximately 30 minutes. It buzzes loudly for much of this time. Due to the firm soil it nests in, it must dig for the loose sand or dirt it requires to fill the hole. It may dig a second hole and use the dirt from it to fill the first. It has been observed using small pebbles or pieces of wood to hammer and push the dirt into the hole.

The egg hatches in two days. After five days of feeding, the larva reaches maturity.
