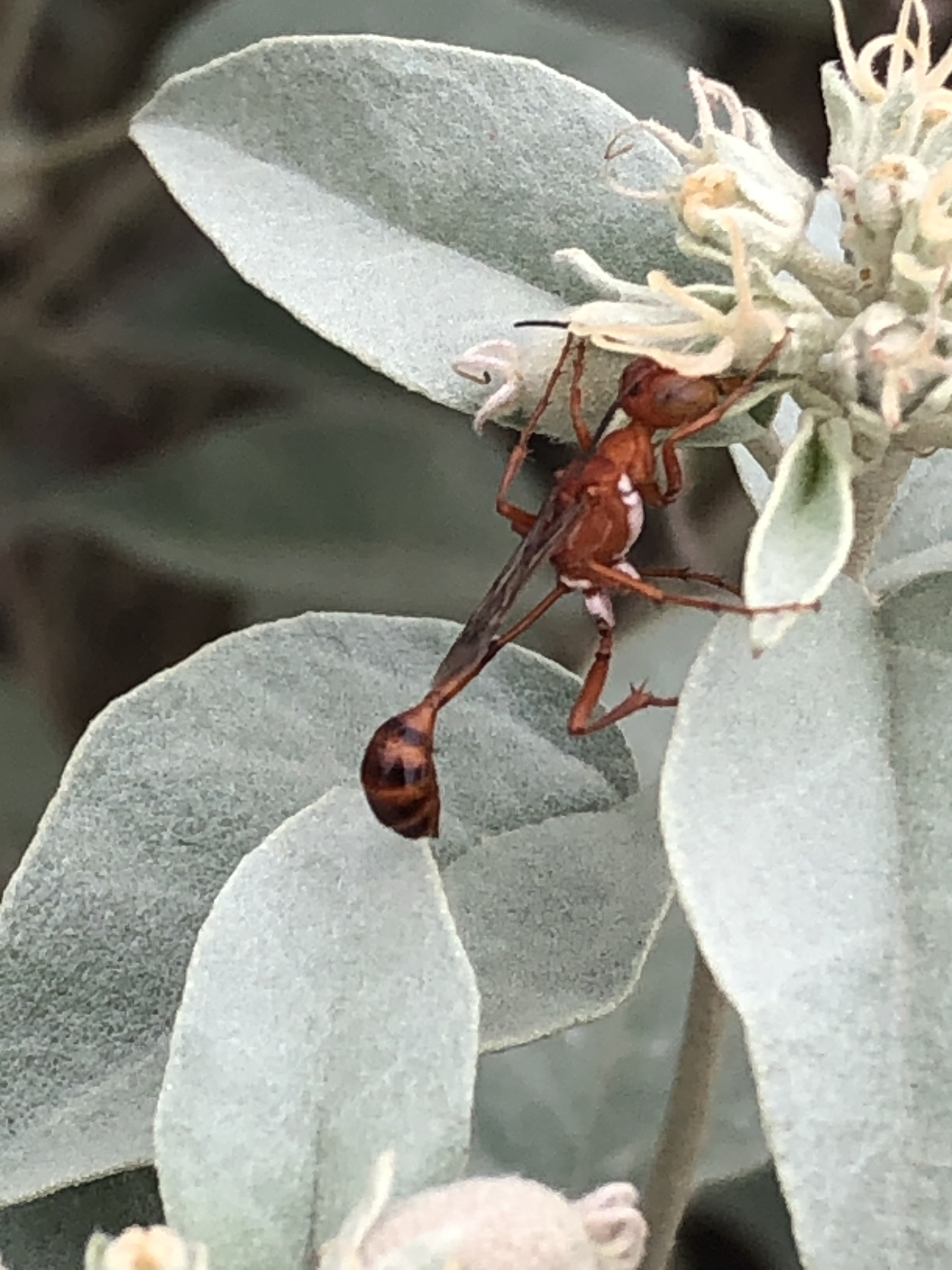

Scientific classification
- Kingdom: Animalia
- Phylum: Arthropoda
- Class: Insecta
- Order: Hymenoptera
- Family: Sphecidae
- Genus: Ammophila
- Species: A. wrightii

Binomial name
- Ammophila wrightii (Cresson, 1868)

Synonyms
- Coloptera wrightii Cresson, 1868

= Ammophila wrightii =

Species of wasp

Ammophila wrightii is a species of thread-waisted wasp in the family Sphecidae.
