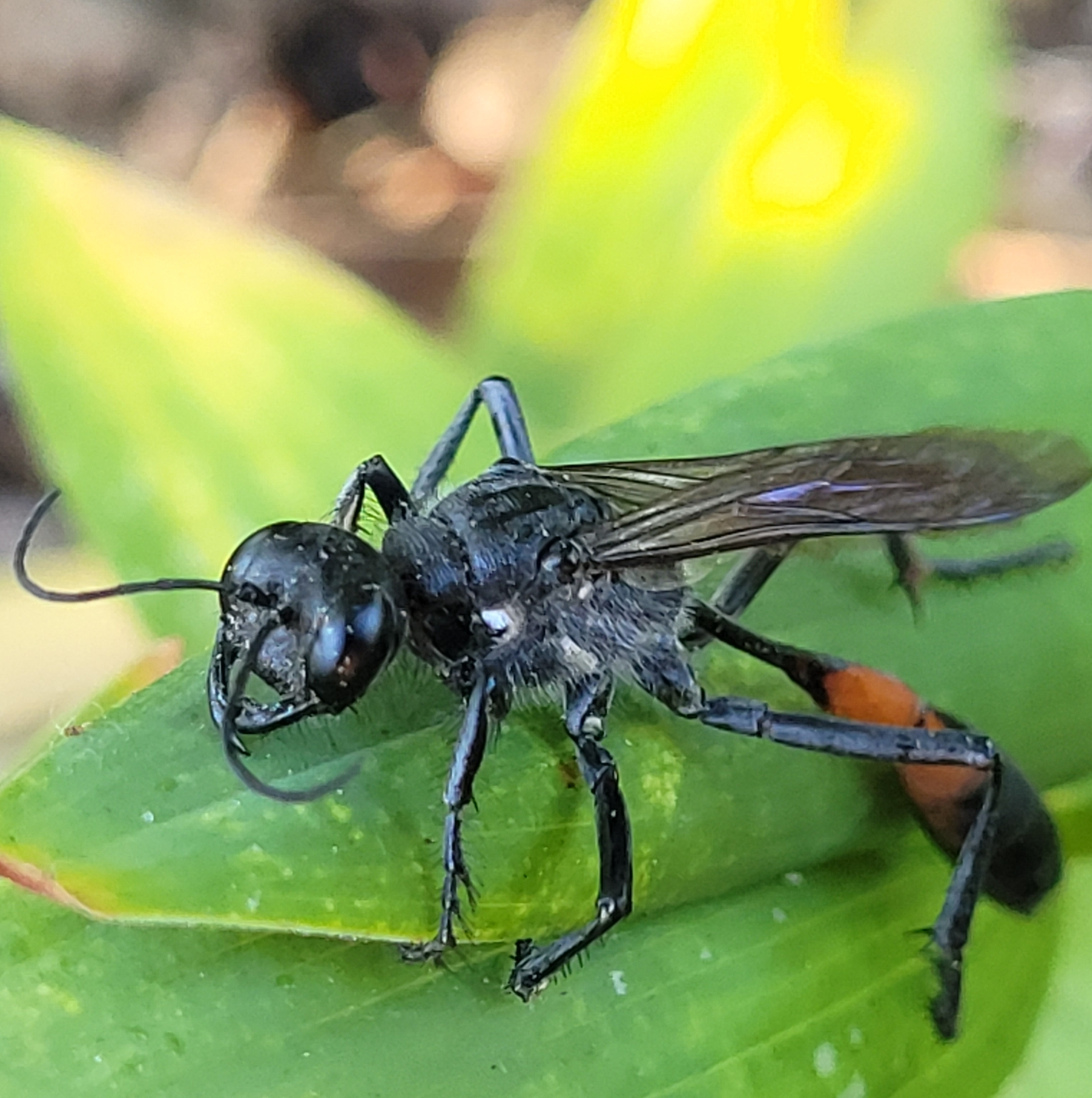

Scientific classification
- Kingdom: Animalia
- Phylum: Arthropoda
- Clade: Pancrustacea
- Class: Insecta
- Order: Hymenoptera
- Family: Sphecidae
- Genus: Ammophila; W. Kirby, 1798
- Species: A. macra

Binomial name
- Ammophila macra Cresson, 1865

Synonyms
- Sphex macrus (Cresson, 1865)

= Ammophila macra =

Species of wasp

Ammophila macra is a species of wasp of the genus Ammophila, family Sphecidae.

== Taxonomy ==
It was found for first time in 1865 by Cresson.
