= Vsevolod Gussakovskiy =

Vsevolod Vladimirovich Gussakovskiy (11 October 1904 in Tsarskoye Selo – September, 1948) was a Soviet entomologist who specialised in Hymenoptera. He described many new species.

His collections from Turkestan are held (ex parte) by the Zoological Museum of the Zoological Institute of the Russian Academy of Sciences.

== Works ==
- Gussakovskiy, V. V., 1930. Novyie i malo izvestnyie vidy rodov Ammophila Kby. I Sphex L. (Hymenoptera, Sphecidae) Species novae vel parum cognitae generum Ammophila Kby. et Sphex L. (Hymenoptera, Sphecidae). Russkoye Entomologicheskoye Obozreniye 24 : 1 99-211 .
- Gussakovskiy, V. V., 1933 (1932). Sphecidae i Psammocharidae (Hymenoptera), sobrannyie N. Zarudnym v vostochnoy Persii Sphecidae et Psammocharidae (Hymenoptera), a cl. N. Zarudnyi in Persia orientali collectae. Trudy Zoologischeskogo Instituta Akademii Nauk SSSR (= Travaux de l'Institut Zoologique de l'Académie des Sciences de l'URSS) 1:369-104 (misprinted as 269-304).
- Gussakovskiy, V. V., 1934.Schwedisch-Chinesische Wissenschaftliche Expedition nach den nordwestlichen Provinzen Chinas unter Leitung von Dr. Sven Hedin und Prof. Sii Ping-Chang. Insekten gesammelt vom Schwedischen Arzt der Expedition Dr.David Hummel 1927-1930. 41. Hymenoptera. 6. Sphegidae. Arkiv for Zoologi 27A(21): 1-15.
- Gussakovskiy, V. V., 1935. K faune os (Hymenoptera, Sphecodea et Vespodea) Tadzhikistana Sphecodea und Vespodea von Tadjikistan. Trudy Tadzhikskoy Bazy Akademii Nauk SSSR (= Travaux de la Filiale de l'Académie des Sciences de l'URSS et Tadjikistan) 5:409-467.
- Gussakovskiy, V.V. 1937 Obzor palearkticheskikh vidov rodov Didineis Wesm., Pison Latr. i Psen Latr. (Hymenoptera, Sphecodea).Trudy Zoologicheskogo Instituta Akademii Nauk SSSR, 4, 599–698. [plate. I]
