= Ammophila juncea =

Scientific classification
- Kingdom: Animalia
- Phylum: Arthropoda
- Class: Insecta
- Order: Hymenoptera
- Family: Sphecidae
- Genus: Ammophila
- Species: A. juncea

Binomial name
- Ammophila juncea Cresson, 1865

Synonyms
- Ammophila montezuma Cameron, 1888

Species of wasp

Ammophila juncea is a species of thread-waisted wasp in the family Sphecidae.
