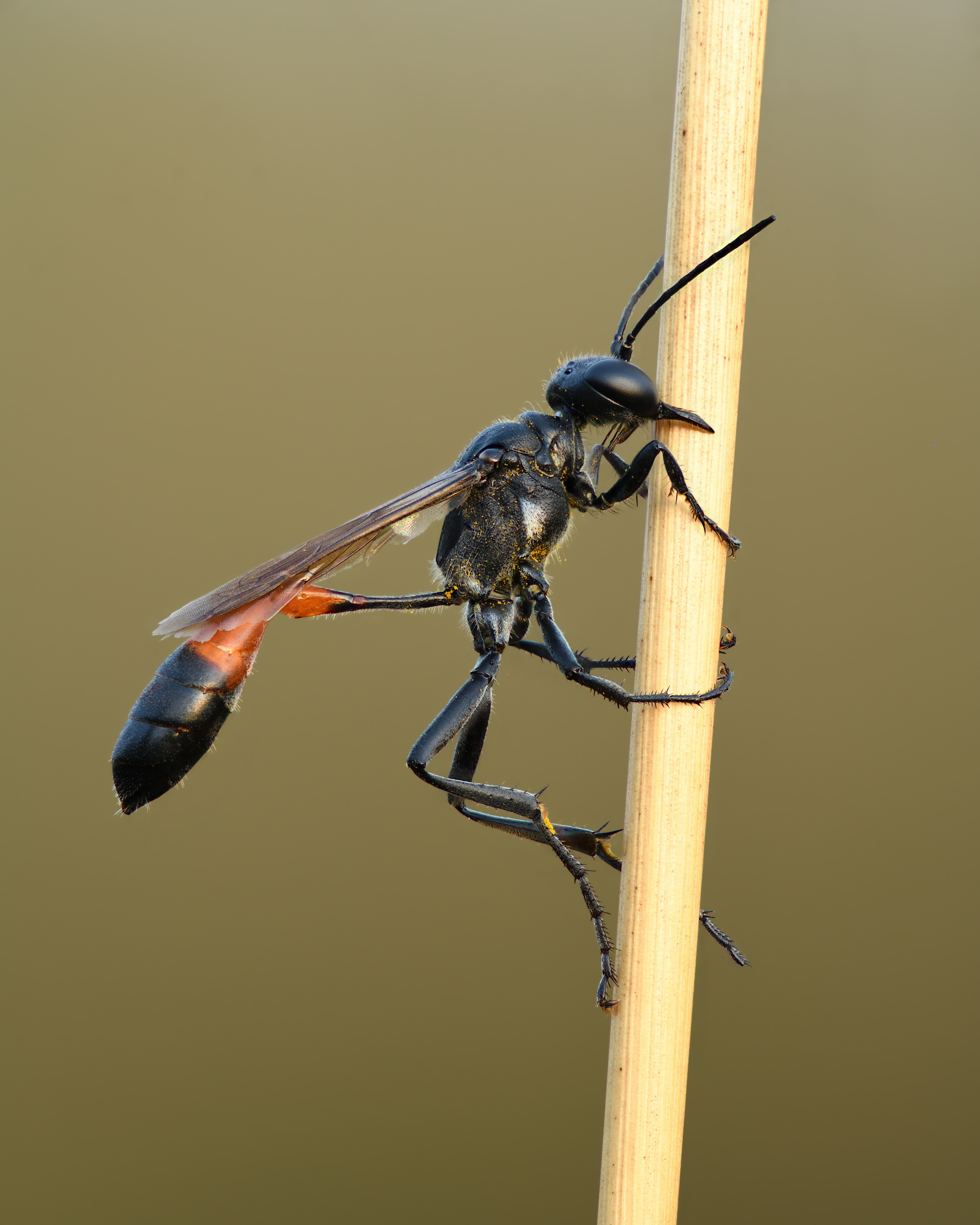
- Ammophila pubescens

Scientific classification
- Kingdom: Animalia
- Phylum: Arthropoda
- Class: Insecta
- Order: Hymenoptera
- Family: Sphecidae
- Subfamily: Ammophilinae
- Genus: Ammophila; W. Kirby, 1798

Type species
- Ammophila sabulosa (Linnaeus, 1758)

Species
- Many (>200 species + subspecies)

= Ammophila (wasp) =

Genus of wasps

Ammophila is the type genus of the subfamily Ammophilinae of the hunting wasp family Sphecidae. Ammophila is a large and cosmopolitan genus, with over 200 species, mostly occurring in the warmer regions of all continents apart from Antarctica.

== Vernacular names ==
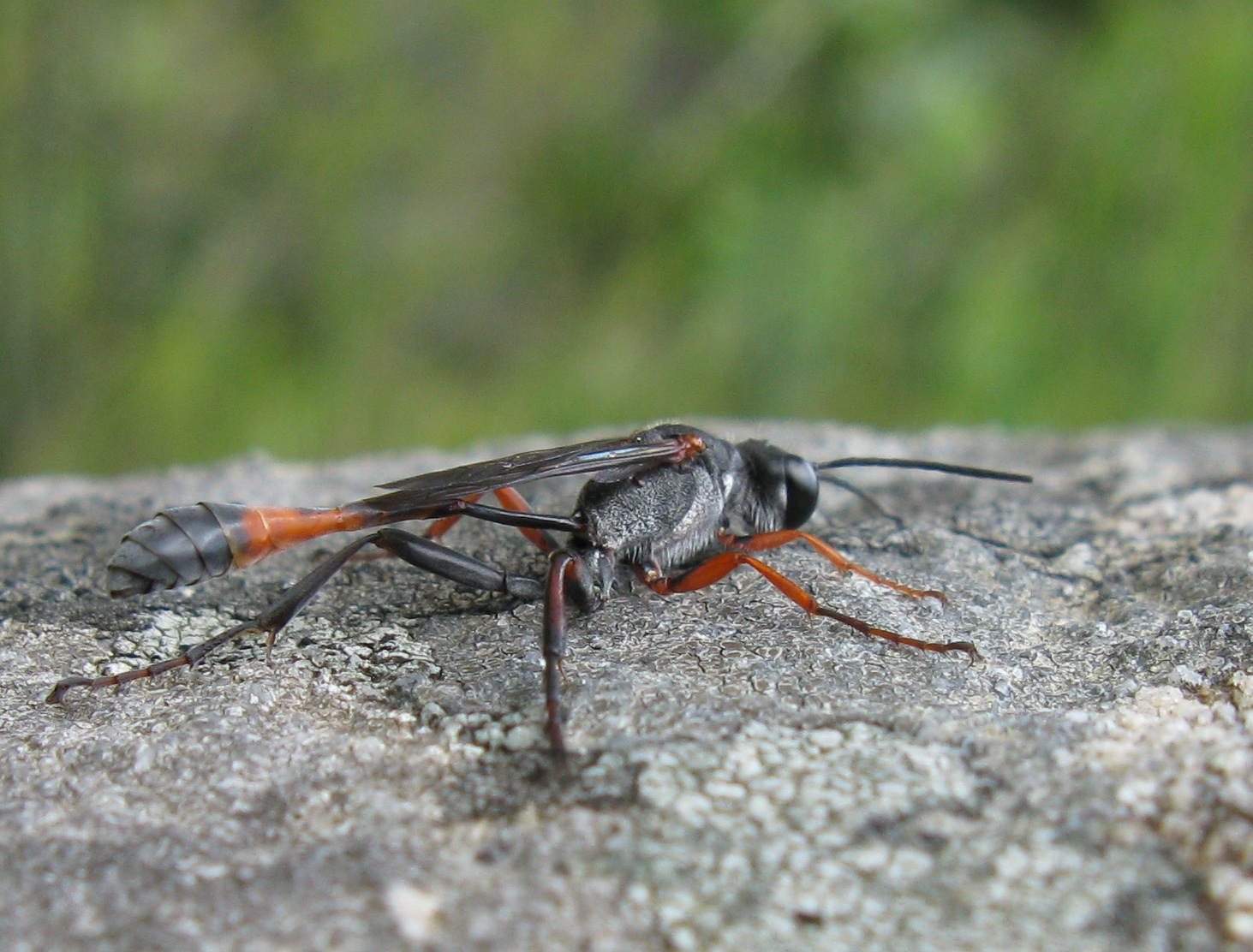
Ammophila ferrugineipes

Ammophila species are sometimes referred to as "thread-waisted wasps", but the name is not definitive, because many other members of the family Sphecidae are thread-waisted and referred to as such. Sometimes Ammophiline wasps are referred to as "sand wasps"; this is consistent with the name Ammophila, which derives from the Greek for "sand lover" (many species dig their nests in sand). However, this common name is used primarily for wasps in the family Bembicidae, in the tribe Bembicini. As is frequent in dealing with common names, no definitive common name for the Ammophilinae exists; entomologists usually confine themselves to the technical names for convenience and clarity.

== Morphology and habits ==
As is frequent in large genera, considerable variation occurs in their habits and appearance, but predominantly they are medium-sized wasps of strikingly slender build, with antennae about as long as the head plus thorax.

The jaws are not large, but are strong and apart from feeding and digging, often are used for unexpected functions such as holding a pebble with which the wasp hammers down soil to seal a nest, or to grip the stem of a plant at night, holding its body at right-angles to the stem, its legs folded and all the weight taken up by the mandibles. This habit is not unique to the Ammophilinae – some bees, such as Amegilla, also overnight in that way, and Fabre documented some others.

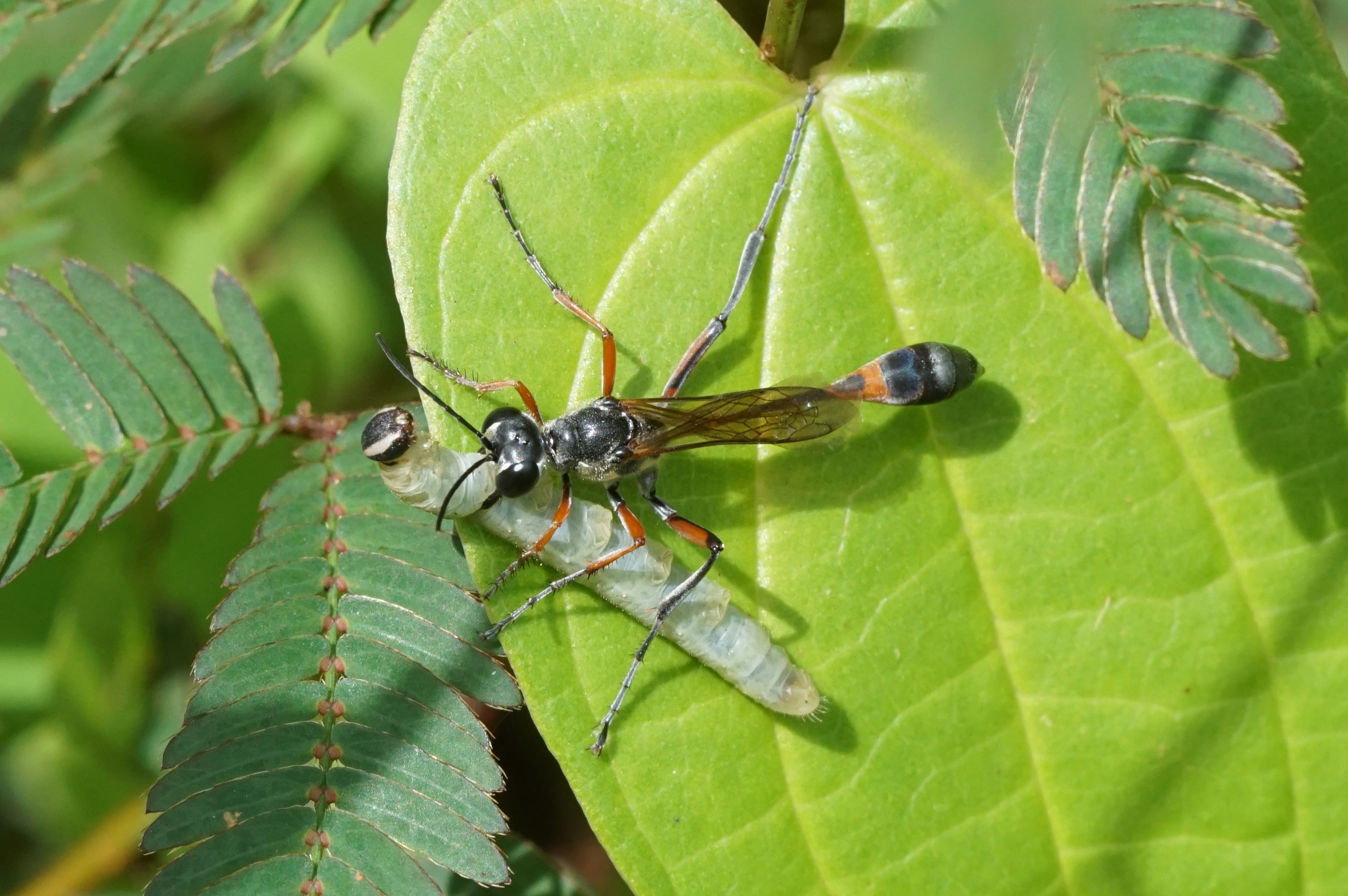
Ammophila with a captured caterpillar

== Nesting ==
Nesting is generally by digging an unbranched tunnel in sandy soil, but provisioning can be progressive, the mother bringing prey as the larva requires it, or mass provisioning, where each nest is provided with a single large prey item, or as many small prey items as should be required.

== Species ==
Ammophila heydeni

The genus Ammophila was created by the English parson-naturalist William Kirby in 1798. It contains 243 extant species:

- Ammophila aberti Haldeman, 1852
- Ammophila abnormis Dollfuss, 2013
- Ammophila acuta (Fernald, 1934)
- Ammophila adelpha Kohl, 1901
- Ammophila aellos Menke, 1966
- Ammophila afghanica Balthasar, 1957
- Ammophila africana Dollfuss, 2015
- Ammophila albotomentosa Morice, 1900
- Ammophila altigena Gussakovskij, 1930
- Ammophila antenniferruginea Yan and Q. Li, 2010
- Ammophila antoninae Danilov, 2018
- Ammophila antropovi Dollfuss, 2013
- Ammophila aphrodite Menke, 1964
- Ammophila apicalis Guérin-Méneville, 1835
- Ammophila arabica W.F. Kirby, 1900
- Ammophila ardens F. Smith, 1868
- Ammophila areolata Walker, 1871
- Ammophila argyrocephala Arnold, 1951
- Ammophila arnoldi Dollfuss, 2015
- Ammophila arvensis Lepeletier de Saint Fargeau, 1845
- Ammophila asiatica Tsuneki, 1971
- Ammophila assimilis Kohl, 1901
- Ammophila atripes F. Smith, 1852
- Ammophila aucella Menke, 1966
- Ammophila aurifera R. Turner, 1908
- Ammophila azteca Cameron, 1888
- Ammophila barbara (Lepeletier de Saint Fargeau, 1845)
- Ammophila barbarorum Arnold, 1951
- Ammophila barkalovi Danilov, 2015
- Ammophila beaumonti Dollfuss, 2013
- Ammophila bechuana (R. Turner, 1929)
- Ammophila bella Menke, 1966
- Ammophila bellula Menke, 1964
- Ammophila beniniensis (Palisot de Beauvois, 1806)
- Ammophila bispinosa Dollfuss, 2015
- Ammophila boharti Menke, 1964
- Ammophila borealis Q. Li and C. Yang, 1990
- Ammophila braunsi (R. Turner, 1919)
- Ammophila breviceps F. Smith, 1856
- Ammophila brevipennis Bingham, 1897
- Ammophila californica Menke, 1964
- Ammophila calva (Arnold, 1920)
- Ammophila campestris Latreille, 1809
- Ammophila caprella Arnold, 1951
- Ammophila cellularis Gussakovskij, 1930
- Ammophila centralis Cameron, 1888
- Ammophila centroafricana Dollfuss, 2015
- Ammophila clavus (Fabricius, 1775)
- Ammophila cleopatra Menke, 1964
- Ammophila clypeola Q. Li and C. Yang, 1990
- Ammophila clypeolineata Dollfuss, 2015
- Ammophila coachella Menke, 1966
- Ammophila conditor F. Smith, 1856
- Ammophila confusa A. Costa, 1864
- Ammophila conifera (Arnold, 1920)
- Ammophila cora Cameron, 1888
- Ammophila coronata A. Costa, 1864
- Ammophila crassifemoralis (R. Turner, 1919)
- Ammophila cybele Menke, 1970
- Ammophila dantoni Roth in Nadig, 1933
- Ammophila dejecta Cameron, 1888
- Ammophila dentigera Gussakovskij, 1928
- Ammophila deserticola Tsuneki, 1971
- Ammophila djaouak de Beaumont, 1956
- Ammophila dolichocephala Cameron, 1910
- Ammophila dolichodera Kohl, 1884
- Ammophila dubia Kohl, 1901
- Ammophila duhokensis Augul, Abdoul-Rassoul, and Kaddou, 2013
- Ammophila dysmica Menke, 1966
- Ammophila electa Kohl, 1901
- Ammophila elongata Fischer de Waldheim, 1843
- Ammophila erminea Kohl, 1901
- Ammophila evansi Menke, 1964
- Ammophila exsecta Kohl, 1906
- Ammophila extremitata Cresson, 1865
- Ammophila eyrensis R. Turner, 1908
- Ammophila femurrubra W. Fox, 1894
- Ammophila fernaldi (Murray, 1938)
- Ammophila ferruginosa Cresson, 1865
- Ammophila filata Walker, 1871
- Ammophila fischeri Dollfuss, 2015
- Ammophila formicoides Menke, 1964
- Ammophila formosensis Tsuneki, 1971
- Ammophila ganquana Yang and Li, 1989
- Ammophila gaumeri Cameron, 1888
- Ammophila globifrontalis Q. Li and Ch. Yang, 1995
- Ammophila globiverticalis Ch. Wang and L. Ma, 2018
- Ammophila gracilis Lepeletier de Saint Fargeau, 1845
- Ammophila gracillima Taschenberg, 1869
- Ammophila guichardi de Beaumont, 1956
- Ammophila gusenleitneri Dollfuss, 2013
- Ammophila gussakovskii Dollfuss, 2013
- Ammophila haimatosoma Kohl, 1884
- Ammophila haladai Dollfuss, 2013
- Ammophila hallelujah Menke, 2020
- Ammophila harti (Fernald, 1931)
- Ammophila hemilauta Kohl, 1906
- Ammophila hermosa Menke, 1966
- Ammophila heteroclypeola Li and Xue, 1998
- Ammophila hevans Menke, 2004
- Ammophila heydeni Dahlbom, 1845
- Ammophila holosericea (Fabricius, 1793)
- Ammophila honorei Alfieri, 1946
- Ammophila horni von Schulthess, 1927
- Ammophila hungarica Mocsáry, 1883
- Ammophila hurdi Menke, 1964
- Ammophila iliensis Kazenas, 2001
- Ammophila imitator Menke, 1966
- Ammophila induta Kohl, 1901
- Ammophila infesta F. Smith, 1873
- Ammophila insignis F. Smith, 1856
- Ammophila insolata F. Smith, 1858
- Ammophila instabilis F. Smith, 1856
- Ammophila juncea Cresson, 1865
- Ammophila kalaharica (Arnold, 1935)
- Ammophila karenae Menke, 1964
- Ammophila kennedyi (Murray, 1938)
- Ammophila kenyensis Dollfuss, 2015
- Ammophila kondarensis Danilov, 2018
- Ammophila kowalczyki Olszewski, 2020
- Ammophila laeviceps F. Smith, 1873
- Ammophila laevicollis Ed. André, 1886
- Ammophila laevigata F. Smith, 1856
- Ammophila laminituberalis Ch. Wang and Ma, 2018
- Ammophila lampei Strand, 1910
- Ammophila lativalvis Gussakovskij, 1928
- Ammophila leclercqi Menke, 1964
- Ammophila leoparda (Fernald, 1934)
- Ammophila linda Menke, 2020
- Ammophila longiclypeata Dollfuss, 2015
- Ammophila macra Cresson, 1865
- Ammophila malickyi Dollfuss, 2015
- Ammophila marshi Menke, 1964
- Ammophila mcclayi Menke, 1964
- Ammophila mediata Cresson, 1865
- Ammophila menghaiana Q. Li and C. Yang, 1989
- Ammophila menkei Dollfuss, 2013
- Ammophila meridionalis Kazenas, 1980
- Ammophila mescalero Menke, 1966
- Ammophila mexica Menke, 2020
- Ammophila mimica Menke, 1966
- Ammophila mitlaensis Alfieri, 1961
- Ammophila modesta Mocsáry, 1883
- Ammophila moenkopi Menke, 1967
- Ammophila monachi Menke, 1966
- Ammophila mongolensis Tsuneki, 1971
- Ammophila murrayi Menke, 1964
- Ammophila namibiensis Dollfuss, 2015
- Ammophila nancy Menke, 2007
- Ammophila nasalis Provancher, 1895
- Ammophila nasuta Lepeletier de Saint Fargeau, 1845
- Ammophila nearctica Kohl, 1889
- Ammophila nefertiti Menke, 1964
- Ammophila nemkovi Danilov, 2018
- Ammophila nigri Dollfuss, 2015
- Ammophila nigricans Dahlbom, 1843
- Ammophila nigrifrons Dollfuss, 2015
- Ammophila nigrina F. Morawitz, 1889
- Ammophila nitida Fischer de Waldheim, 1834
- Ammophila novita (Fernald, 1934)
- Ammophila obliquestriolae Yang and Li, 1989
- Ammophila occipitalis F. Morawitz, 1890
- Ammophila ohli Dollfuss, 2013
- Ammophila pachythoracalis Yang and Li, 1989
- Ammophila pakistana Dollfuss, 2013
- Ammophila parapolita (Fernald, 1934)
- Ammophila parapunctaticeps Dollfuss, 2015
- Ammophila parkeri Menke, 1964
- Ammophila peckhami (Fernald, 1934)
- Ammophila peringueyi (Arnold, 1928)
- Ammophila persica Dollfuss, 2013
- Ammophila pevtsovi Danilov, 2015
- Ammophila picipes Cameron, 1888
- Ammophila pictipennis Walsh, 1869
- Ammophila pilimarginata Cameron, 1912
- Ammophila placida F. Smith, 1856
- Ammophila platensis Brèthes, 1909
- Ammophila poecilocnemis Morice, 1900
- Ammophila polita Cresson, 1865
- Ammophila procera Dahlbom, 1843
- Ammophila producticollis Morice, 1900
- Ammophila proxima (F. Smith, 1856)
- Ammophila pruinosa Cresson, 1865
- Ammophila pseudodolichodera Dollfuss, 2015
- Ammophila pseudoheydeni Li and He, 2000
- Ammophila pseudokalaharica Dollfuss, 2015
- Ammophila pseudonasuta Bytinski-Salz in de Beaumont and Bytinski-Salz, 1955
- Ammophila pubescens Curtis, 1836
- Ammophila pulawskii Tsuneki, 1971
- Ammophila punctata F. Smith, 1856
- Ammophila punctaticeps (Arnold, 1920)
- Ammophila punti Guichard, 1988
- Ammophila quadraticollis A. Costa, 1893
- Ammophila rauschi Dollfuss, 2013
- Ammophila regina Menke, 1964
- Ammophila ressli Dollfuss, 2015
- Ammophila roborovskyi Kohl, 1906
- Ammophila rubigegen Q. Li and C. Yang, 1990
- Ammophila rubiginosa Lepeletier de Saint Fargeau, 1845
- Ammophila rubripes Spinola, 1839
- Ammophila ruficosta Spinola, 1851
- Ammophila rufipes Guérin-Méneville, 1831
- Ammophila sabulosa (Linnaeus, 1758)
- Ammophila saengeri Dollfuss, 2015
- Ammophila sarekandana Balthasar, 1957
- Ammophila sareptana Kohl, 1884
- Ammophila saussurei (du Buysson, 1897)
- Ammophila schalleri Dollfuss, 2015
- Ammophila schmideggeri Dollfuss, 2013
- Ammophila separanda F. Morawitz, 1891
- Ammophila sickmanni Kohl, 1901
- Ammophila sinensis Sickmann, 1894
- Ammophila smithii F. Smith, 1856
- Ammophila snizeki Dollfuss, 2015
- Ammophila stangei Menke, 1964
- Ammophila strenua Cresson, 1865
- Ammophila striata Mocsáry, 1878
- Ammophila strumosa Kohl, 1906
- Ammophila subassimilis Strand, 1913
- Ammophila tekkensis Gussakovskij, 1930
- Ammophila terminata F. Smith, 1856
- Ammophila theryi (Gribodo, 1894)
- Ammophila touareg Ed. André, 1886
- Ammophila tsunekii Menke in Bohart and Menke, 1976
- Ammophila tuberculiscutis Turner, 1919
- Ammophila turneri Dollfuss, 2015
- Ammophila tyrannica Cameron, 1890
- Ammophila unita Menke, 1966
- Ammophila untumoris Yang and Li, 1989
- Ammophila urnaria Dahlbom, 1843
- Ammophila vagabunda F. Smith, 1856
- Ammophila varipes Cresson, 1865
- Ammophila vetuberosa Q. Li and J. Yang, 1994
- Ammophila vulcania du Buysson, 1897
- Ammophila wahlbergi Dahlbom, 1845
- Ammophila wrightii (Cresson, 1868)
- Ammophila xinjiangana Q. Li and C. Yang, 1989
- Ammophila yaroslavi Danilov, 2018
- Ammophila zambiensis Dollfuss, 2015
- Ammophila zanthoptera Cameron, 1888
- Ammophila zapoteca Menke, 2020
- Ammophila zetteli Dollfuss, 2015
- Ammophila zimmermannae Dollfuss, 2013
