= Francis David Morice =

Francis David Morice (23 June 1849 in St John's Wood – 21 September 1926 in Woking) was an English entomologist who specialised in Hymenoptera.

The Reverend Francis David Morice was a noted theologist, linguist, and classical scholar who wrote Stories in Attic Greek (London, Rivingtons, 1883), still in print. Educated at Winchester, from which he passed in 1866 to New College, Oxford, he gained high distinction as a classical scholar, and in 1874 was appointed a master at Rugby under Dr. Jex-Blake. Here he remained for twenty years, retiring ultimately in 1894 to Woking, where he took a house next to his great friend Edward Saunders, and devoted himself to entomological research.

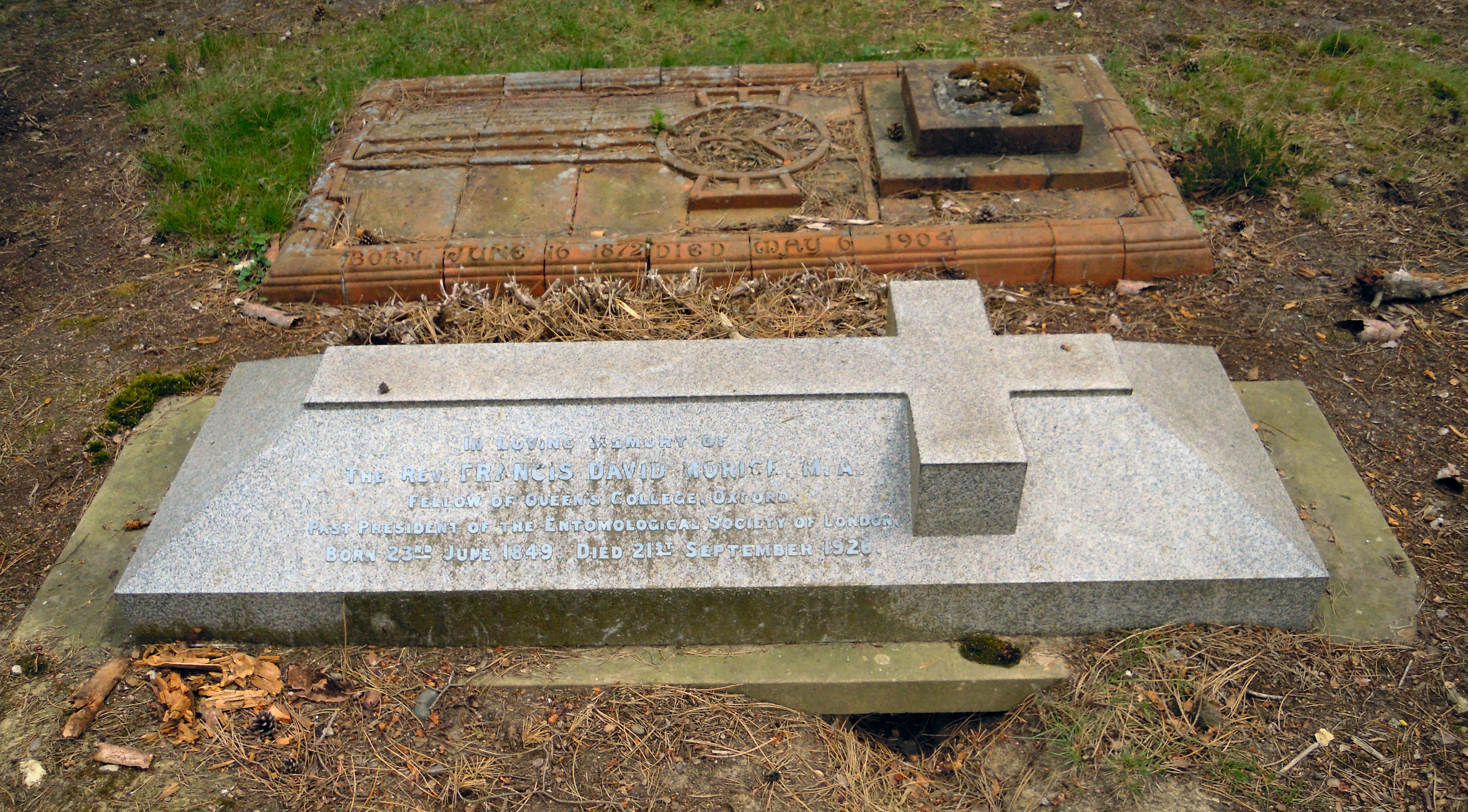
The grave of Francis David Morice (bottom) beside that of Edward Saunders in Brookwood Cemetery in 2019

His work in entomology involved extensive travel. Morice made collecting expeditions to Egypt, Algeria, Asia Minor, Mesopotamia and Persia.

Morice was President of the Royal Entomological Society (1911–1912). He is buried in Brookwood Cemetery next to Edward Saunders.

Insects named in his honour include:

- Ceratina moricei Friese, 1899
- Colletes moricei Saunders, 1904
- Hedychridium moricei (R. du Buysson, 1904)
- Hylaeus moricei (Friese, 1898)
- Mesoleptidea moricei (Schmiedeknecht, 1913)
- Metadrosus moricei (Pic, 1904)

== Works ==
Partial List

- 1897 New or little-known Sphegidae from Egypt. Transactions of the Entomological Society of London 1897:301-316, pl. VI. Correction p 434.
- 1900 Descriptions of new or doubtful species of the genus Ammophila Kirby from Algeria.Annals and Magazine of Natural History (Series 7) 5:64-70.
- 1900 An excursion to Egypt, Asia Minor, &c. in search of Aculeate Hymenoptera. Entomologist's Monthly Magazine 36:164-172. “We had a sort of a pic-nic, organized by Dr. Dinkler on an island in the Nile. This island is known to the Doctor’s friends as Adelen-Insel – having been so named in playful compliment to Mme. A. Dinkler, his wife, and this name is immortalized in some recent German works on Egyptian Hymenoptera. It will not, however, be found in maps or other directories”
- 1903. New Hymenoptera Aculeata taken by the Swedish zoological expedition to the White Nile in the spring of 1901. Annals and Magazine of Natural History (Series 7) 12:610-615.
- 1911. Hymenoptera aculeata collected in Algeria. The Sphegidae (Being Part V of the work commenced by the late Edward Saunders, F.R.S., in Trans. Entomol. Soc., 1901, p. 515).Transactions of the Entomological Society of London 1911:62-135.
- 1915 with John Hartley Durrant The authorship and first publication of the "Jurinean" Genera of Hymenoptera: being a reprint of a long-lost work by Panzer, with a translation into English, an introduction, and bibliographical and critical notes. Transactions of the Entomological Society of London1914:339-436.
- 1917. Further notes on the "Jurinean" Genera of Hymenoptera, correcting errors and omissions in a paper on that subject published in Trans. Entomol. Soc. Lond. 1914, pp. 339–436. Transactions of the Entomological Society of London. 1916:432-442.
- 1921. Annotated lists of Aculeate Hymenoptera (except Heterogyna) and Chrysids recently collected in Mesopotamia and North-West Persia.Journal of the Bombay Natural History Society 27:816-828.
