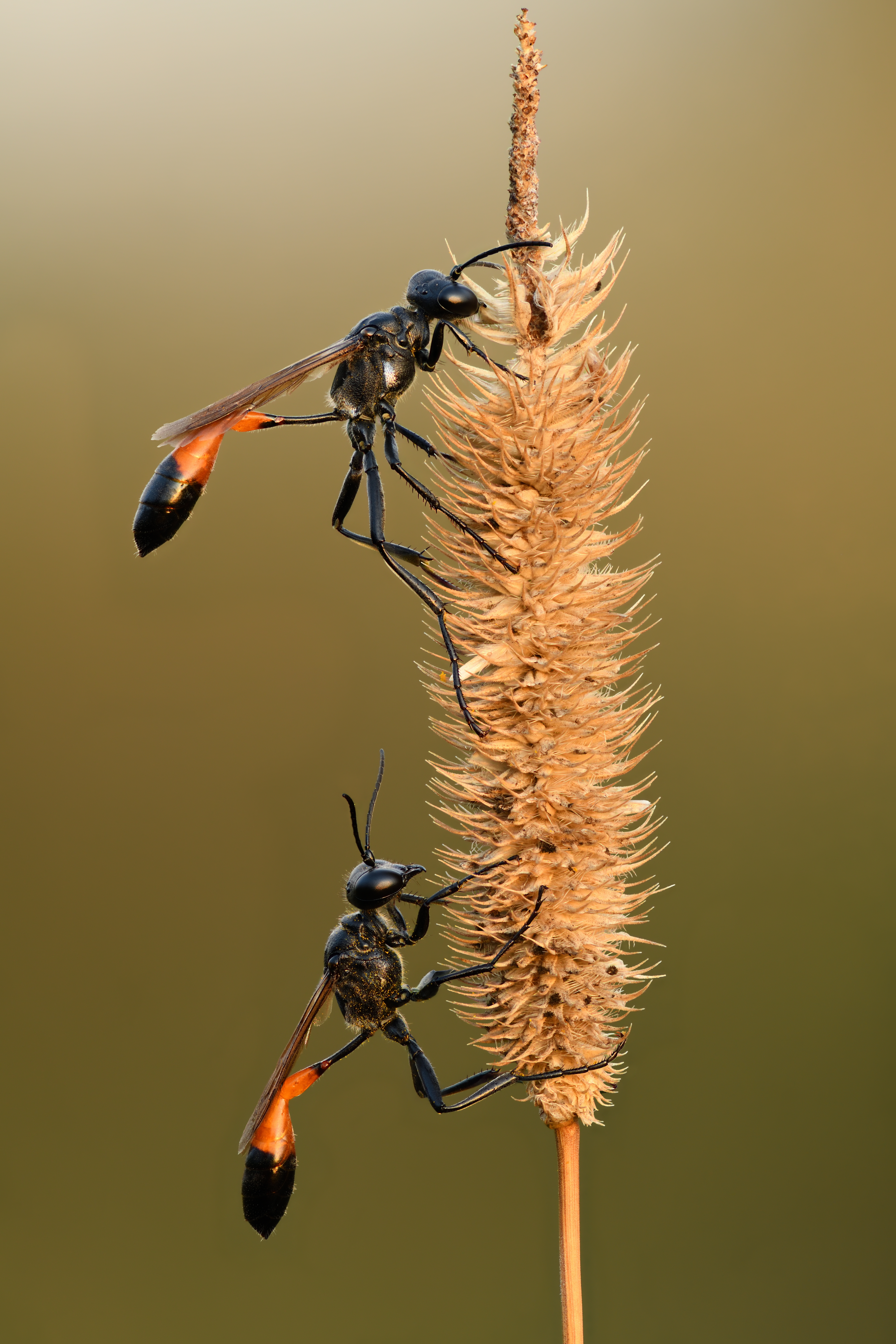
- Ammophila pubescens

Scientific classification
- Domain: Eukaryota
- Kingdom: Animalia
- Phylum: Arthropoda
- Class: Insecta
- Order: Hymenoptera
- Family: Sphecidae
- Subfamily: Ammophilinae; André, 1886

= Ammophilinae =

Subfamily of wasps

Ammophilinae is a subfamily of thread-waisted wasps in the family Sphecidae. There are about 6 genera and more than 320 described species in Ammophilinae.

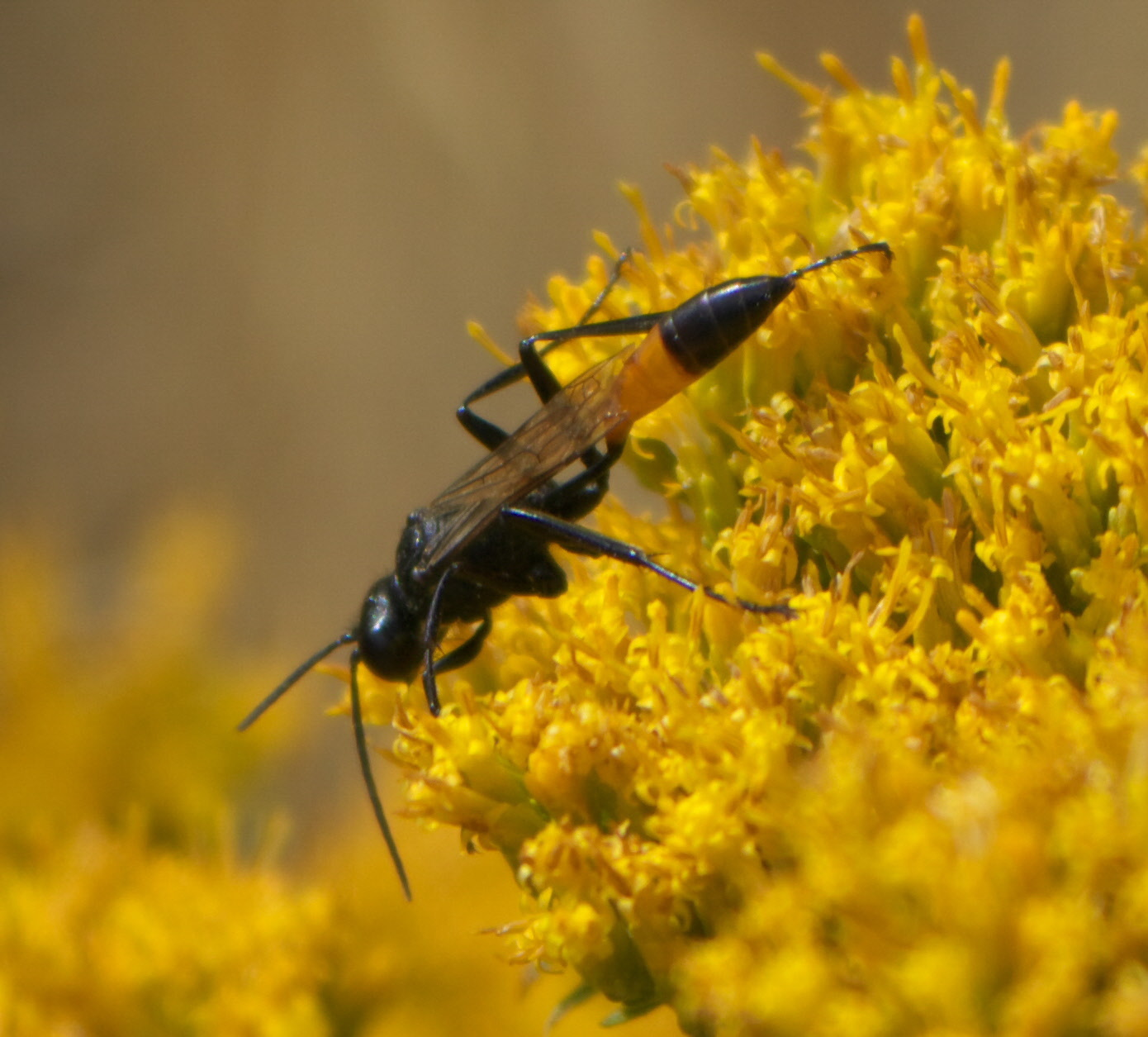
Podalonia

== Genera ==
These six genera belong to the subfamily Ammophilinae:

- Ammophila W. Kirby, 1798
- Eremnophila Menke, 1964
- Eremochares Gribodo, 1883
- Hoplammophila de Beaumont, 1960
- Parapsammophila Taschenberg, 1869
- Podalonia Fernald, 1927 (cutworm wasps)
