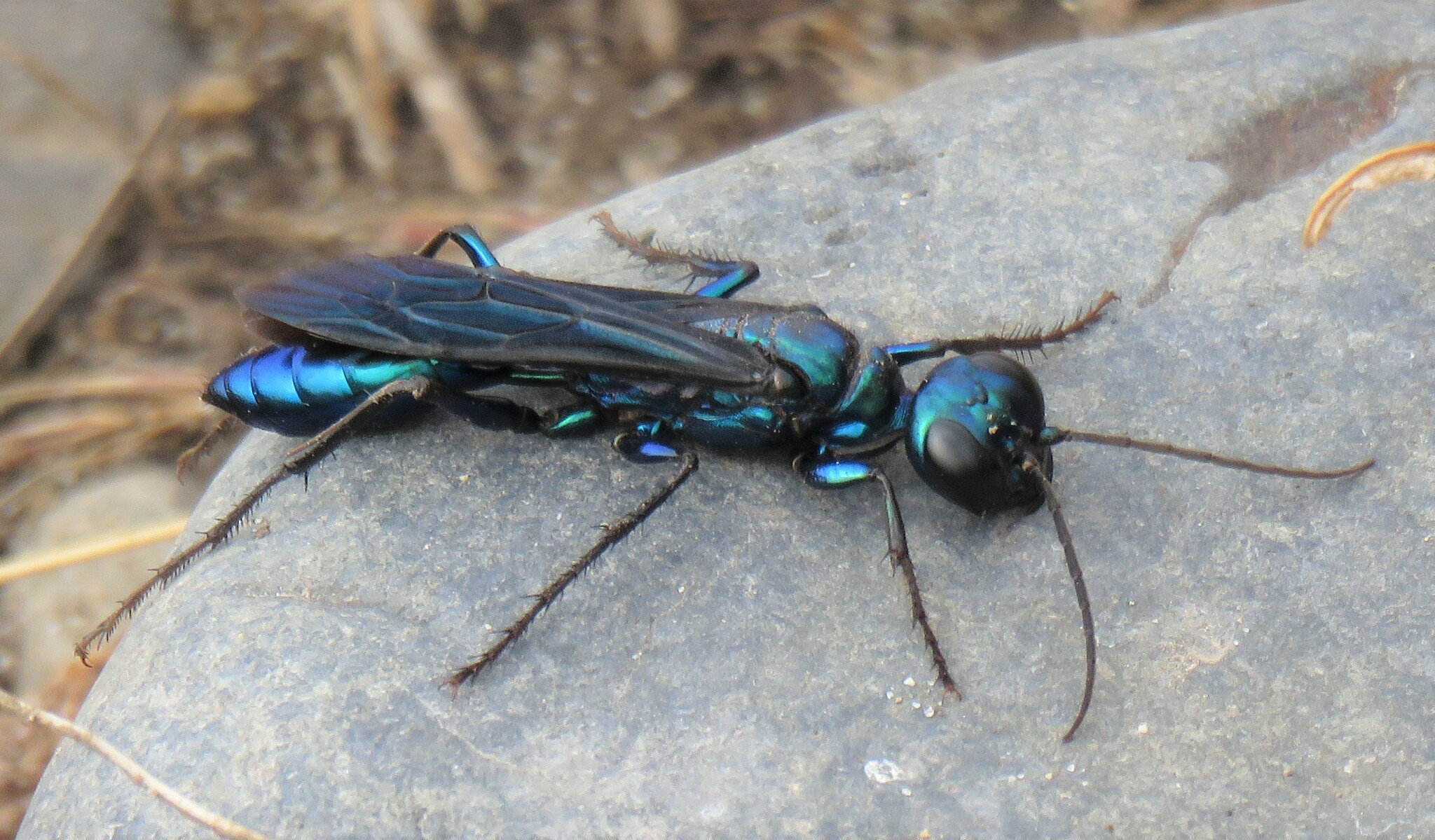
- Nez Perce County, Idaho (2022)

Scientific classification
- Kingdom: Animalia
- Phylum: Arthropoda
- Clade: Pancrustacea
- Class: Insecta
- Order: Hymenoptera
- Family: Sphecidae
- Genus: Chlorion
- Species: C. aerarium

Binomial name
- Chlorion aerarium Patton, 1879

Synonyms
- Sphex nearcticus Kohl, 1890

= Chlorion aerarium =

Species of wasp

Chlorion aerarium, commonly known as the steel-blue cricket hunter, is a species of thread-waisted wasps in the family Sphecidae. It is similar in shape and colour to the blue mud dauber species, Chalybion californicum, which often overlaps in range.
