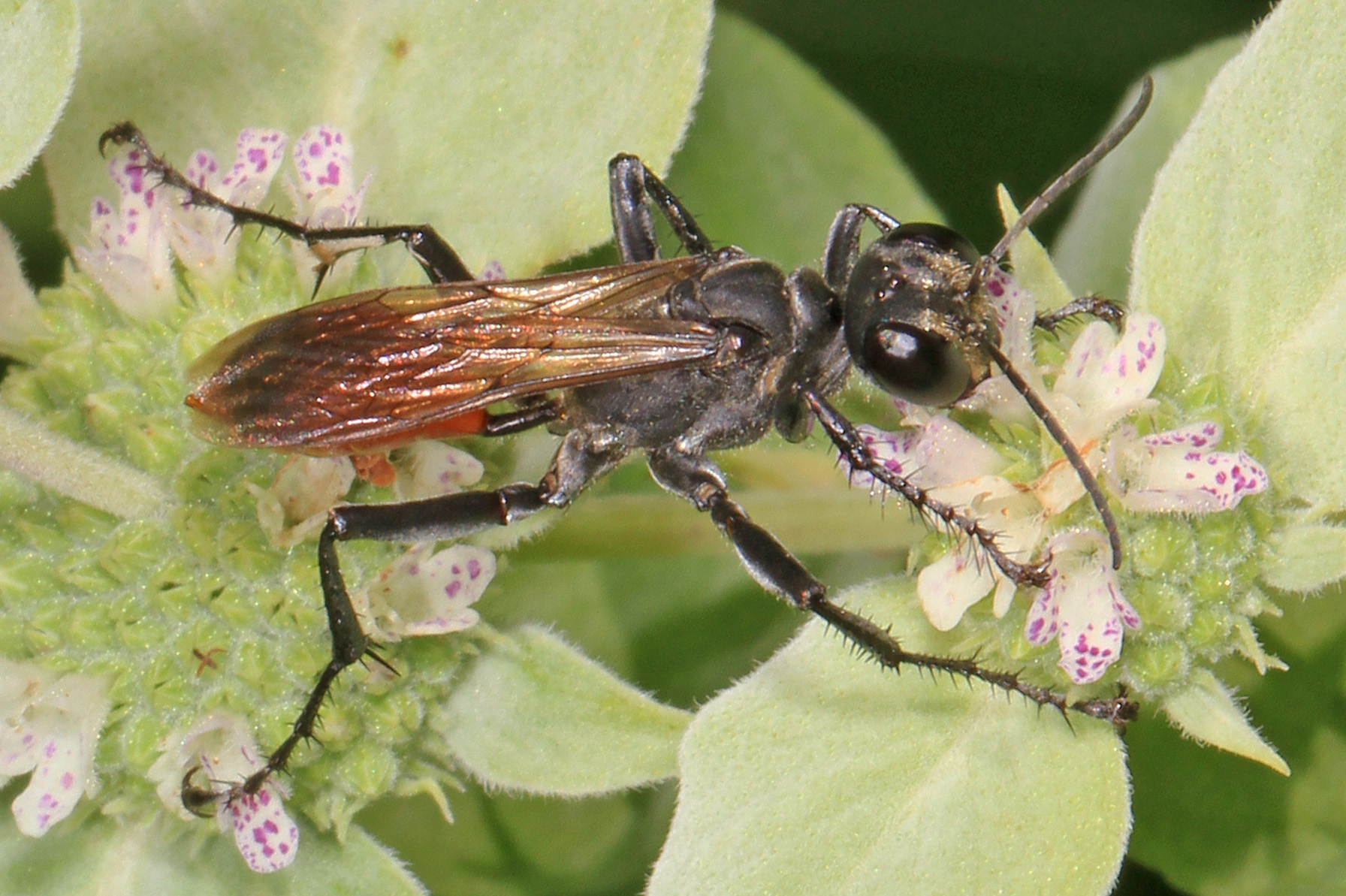

Scientific classification
- Kingdom: Animalia
- Phylum: Arthropoda
- Class: Insecta
- Order: Hymenoptera
- Family: Sphecidae
- Tribe: Prionychini
- Genus: Prionyx
- Species: P. parkeri

Binomial name
- Prionyx parkeri Bohart & Menke, 1963

= Prionyx parkeri =

Species of wasp

Prionyx parkeri is a species of thread-waisted wasp in the family Sphecidae.
