= Prionyx fervens =

Scientific classification
- Kingdom: Animalia
- Phylum: Arthropoda
- Class: Insecta
- Order: Hymenoptera
- Family: Sphecidae
- Genus: Prionyx
- Species: P. fervens

Binomial name
- Prionyx fervens (Linnaeus, 1758)

Synonyms
- Pepsis johannis Fabricius, 1804; Priononyx striatus F. Smith, 1856; Sphex doumerci Lepeletier de Saint Fargeau, 1845; Sphex fervens Linnaeus, 1758; Sphex johannis (Fabricius, 1804); Sphex laerma Cameron, 1897

Species of wasp

Prionyx fervens is a species of thread-waisted wasp in the family Sphecidae.
