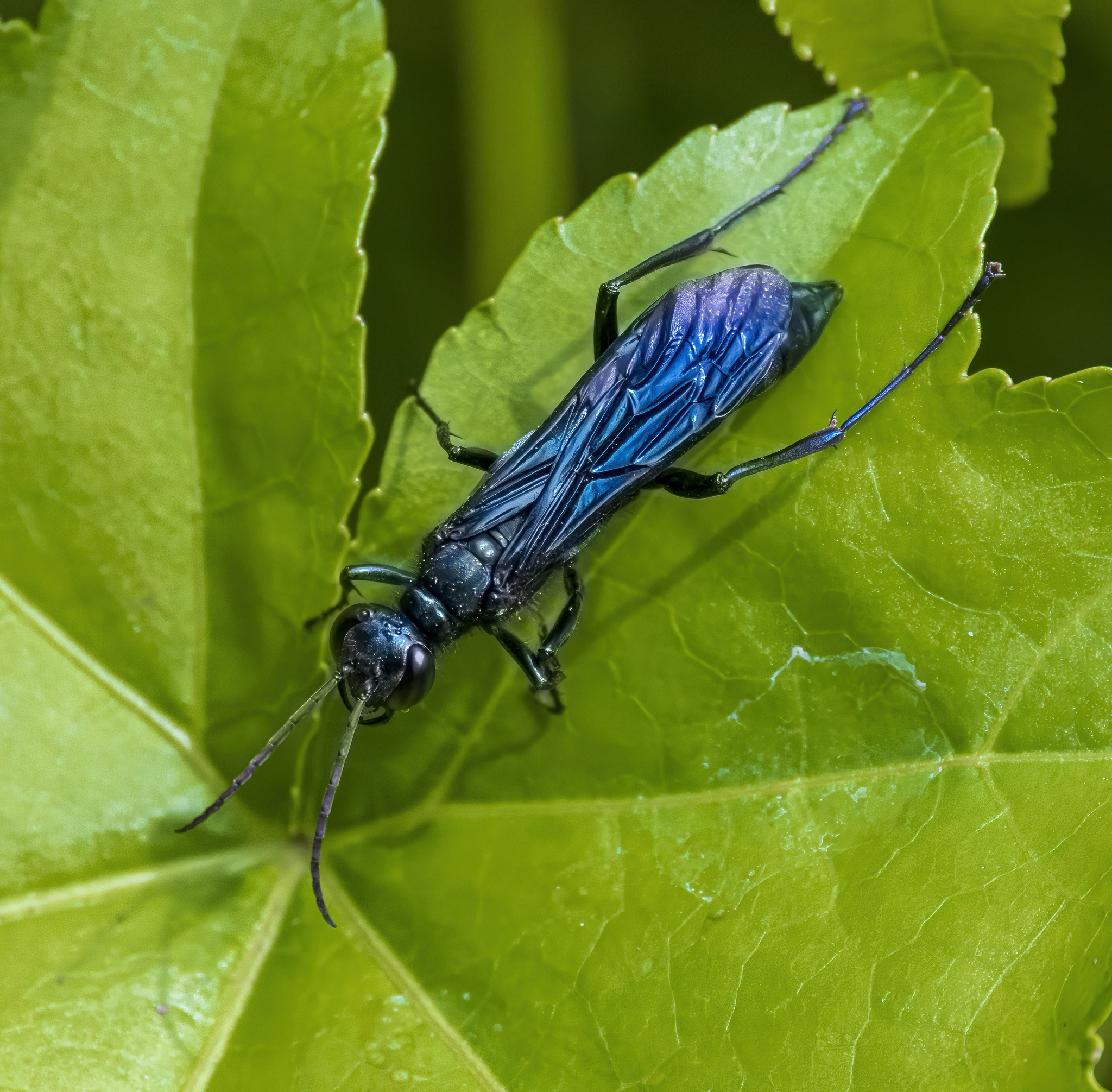

Scientific classification
- Kingdom: Animalia
- Phylum: Arthropoda
- Clade: Pancrustacea
- Class: Insecta
- Order: Hymenoptera
- Family: Sphecidae
- Subfamily: Sceliphrinae
- Tribe: Sceliphrini
- Genus: Chalybion
- Species: C. californicum

Binomial name
- Chalybion californicum (Saussure, 1867)

Synonyms
- Sphex caeruleus Linnaeus, 1763; Sphex cyaneus Fabricius, 1775; Pepsis cyaneus (Fabricius, 1775); Pelopaeus caeruleus (Linnaeus, 1763); Pelopaeus cyaneus (Fabricius, 1775); Pelopeus [sic] californicus de Saussure, 1867; Chlorion coeruleum (Linnaeus, 1763); Chalybion caeruleum (Linnaeus, 1763); Sceliphron californicum (de Saussure, 1867); Sceliphron caeruleum (Linnaeus, 1763); Sceliphron cyaneum (Fabricius, 1775); Chalybion cyaneum (Fabricius, 1775); Sceliphron californicus (de Saussure, 1867)

= Chalybion californicum =

Species of wasp

Chalybion californicum, the Nearctic blue mud-dauber wasp or common blue mud-dauber wasp of North America, is a metallic blue species of mud dauber wasp formally described by Henri Louis Frédéric de Saussure in 1867. It is not normally aggressive towards humans. It is similar in shape and color to the steel-blue cricket hunter (Chlorion aerarium). Like other types of wasps, males do not have an ovipositor, and therefore cannot sting.

== Distribution and habitat ==
It is ranged from northern Mexico to southern Canada, including most of the United States. It has also been introduced to regions including Hawaii, Bermuda, Croatia, and other European countries.

== Behavior ==
Females can build their own nests, but often refurbish nests abandoned by other wasps and bees, particularly those of Sceliphron caementarium, removing any spiders captured by S. caementarium and the larva, replacing it with an egg of its own and freshly caught spiders. They go through multiple generations in a year.

== Interaction with other species ==
This species is most famous for its predation of black widow spiders. Adults feed on the nectar of flowers, which powers their flight. They pollinate some common wildflowers, including Berberis vulgaris, Daucus carota, and Zizia aurea. Larvae are fed spiders, often Latrodectus mactans. They prefer to hunt prey on the ground or under rocks.

== Gallery ==
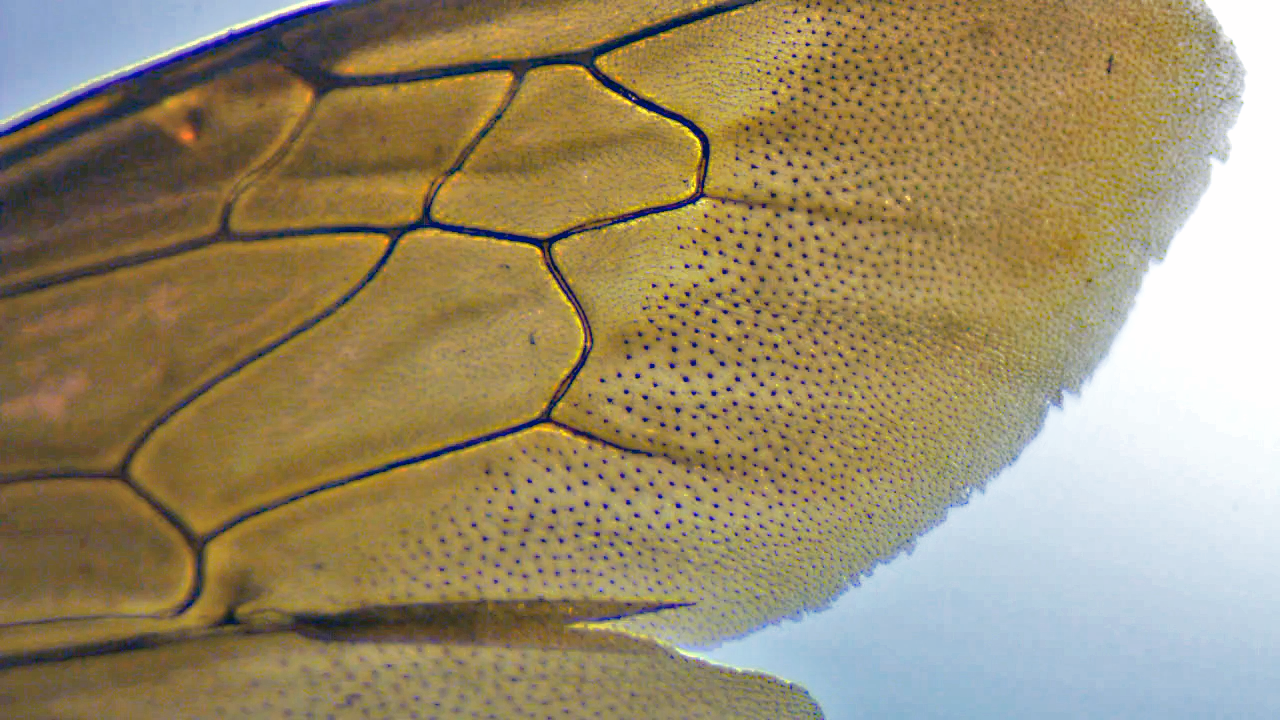
Stereo-microscopic image of Chalybion californicum wing viewed under transmitted light.

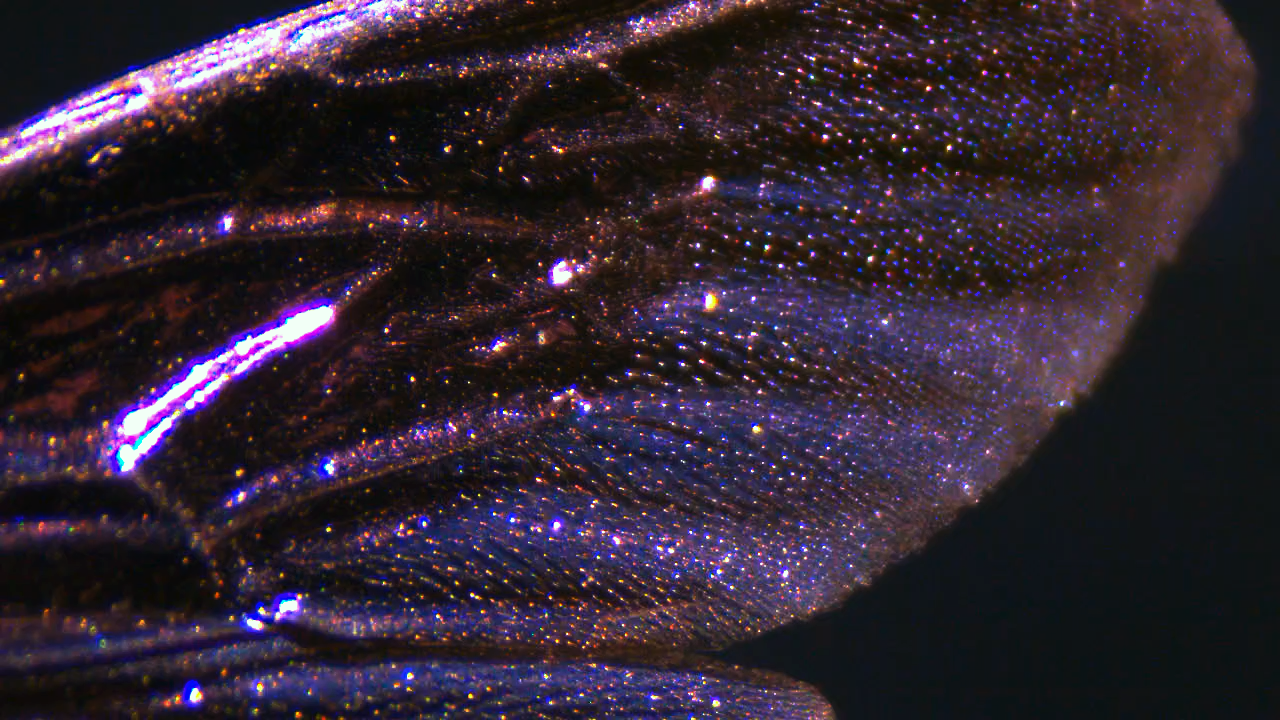
Stereo-microscopic image of Chalybion californicum wing viewed under reflected light.

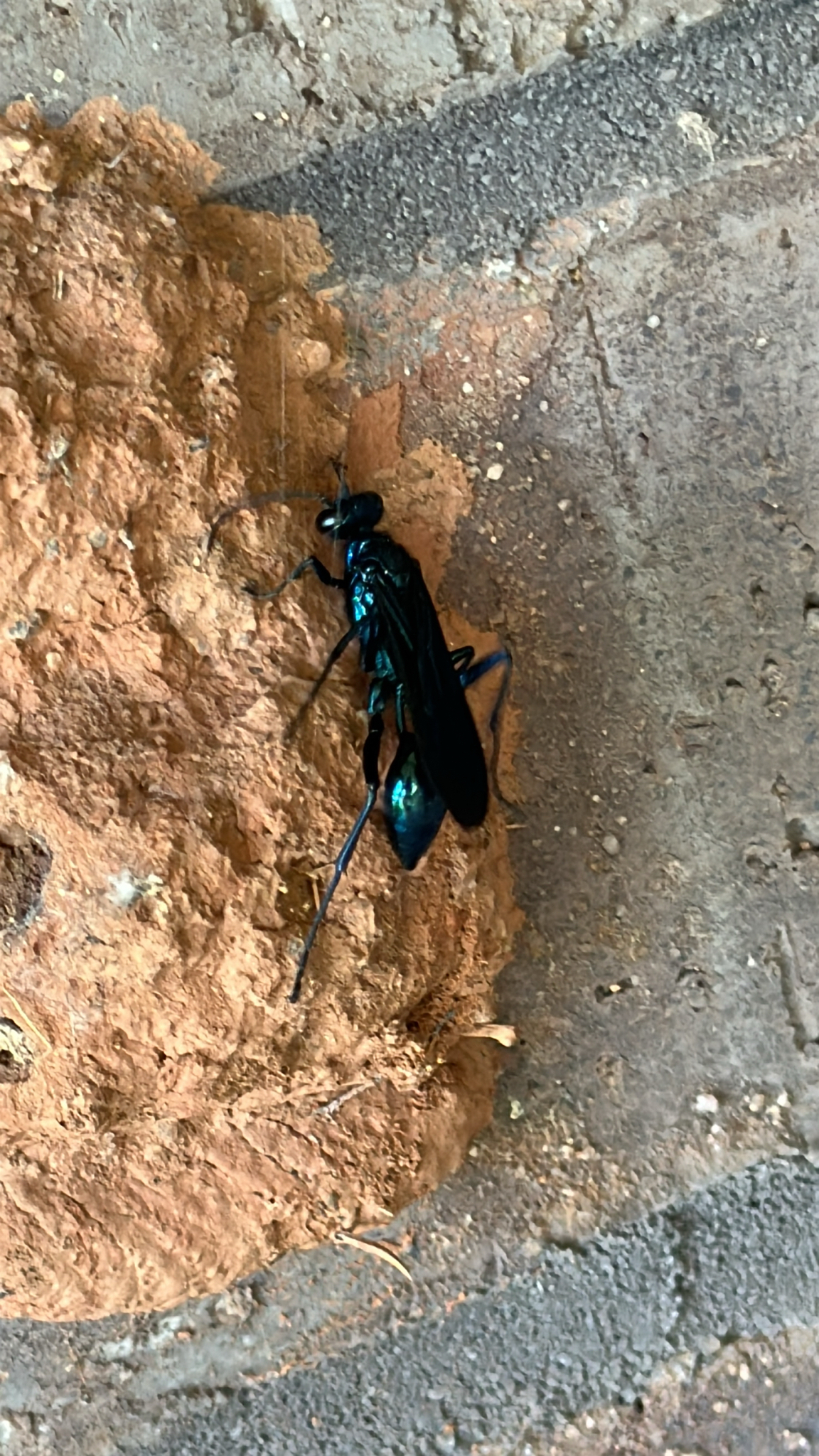
A female Chalybion californicum repurposing an old Sceliphron caementarium nest.
