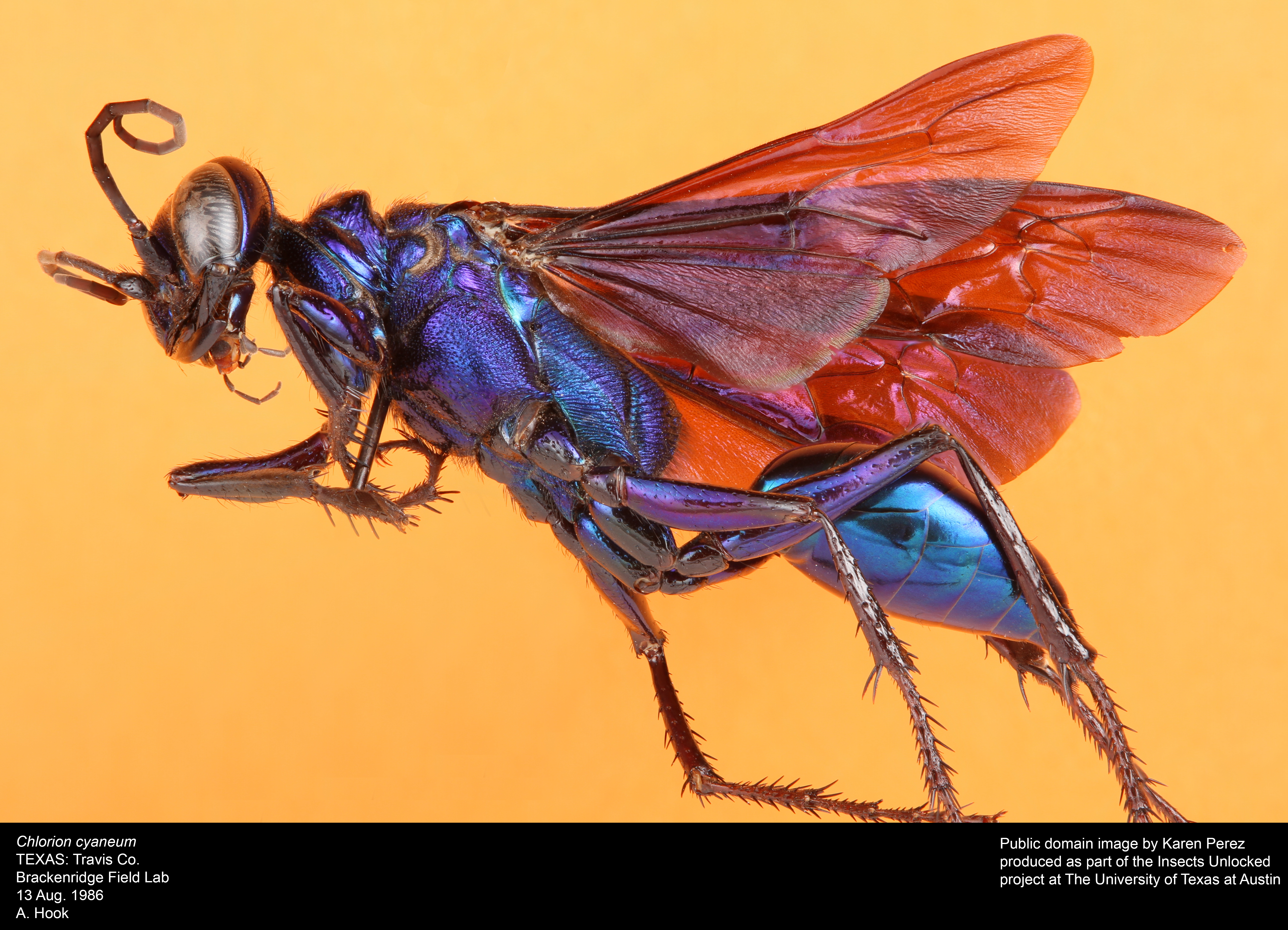

Scientific classification
- Kingdom: Animalia
- Phylum: Arthropoda
- Clade: Pancrustacea
- Class: Insecta
- Order: Hymenoptera
- Family: Sphecidae
- Genus: Chlorion
- Species: C. cyaneum

Binomial name
- Chlorion cyaneum Dahlbom, 1843

Synonyms
- Sphex occultus Kohl, 1890

= Chlorion cyaneum =

Species of wasp

Chlorion cyaneum, the iridescent cockroach-hunter wasp, is a species of thread-waisted wasp in the family Sphecidae.
