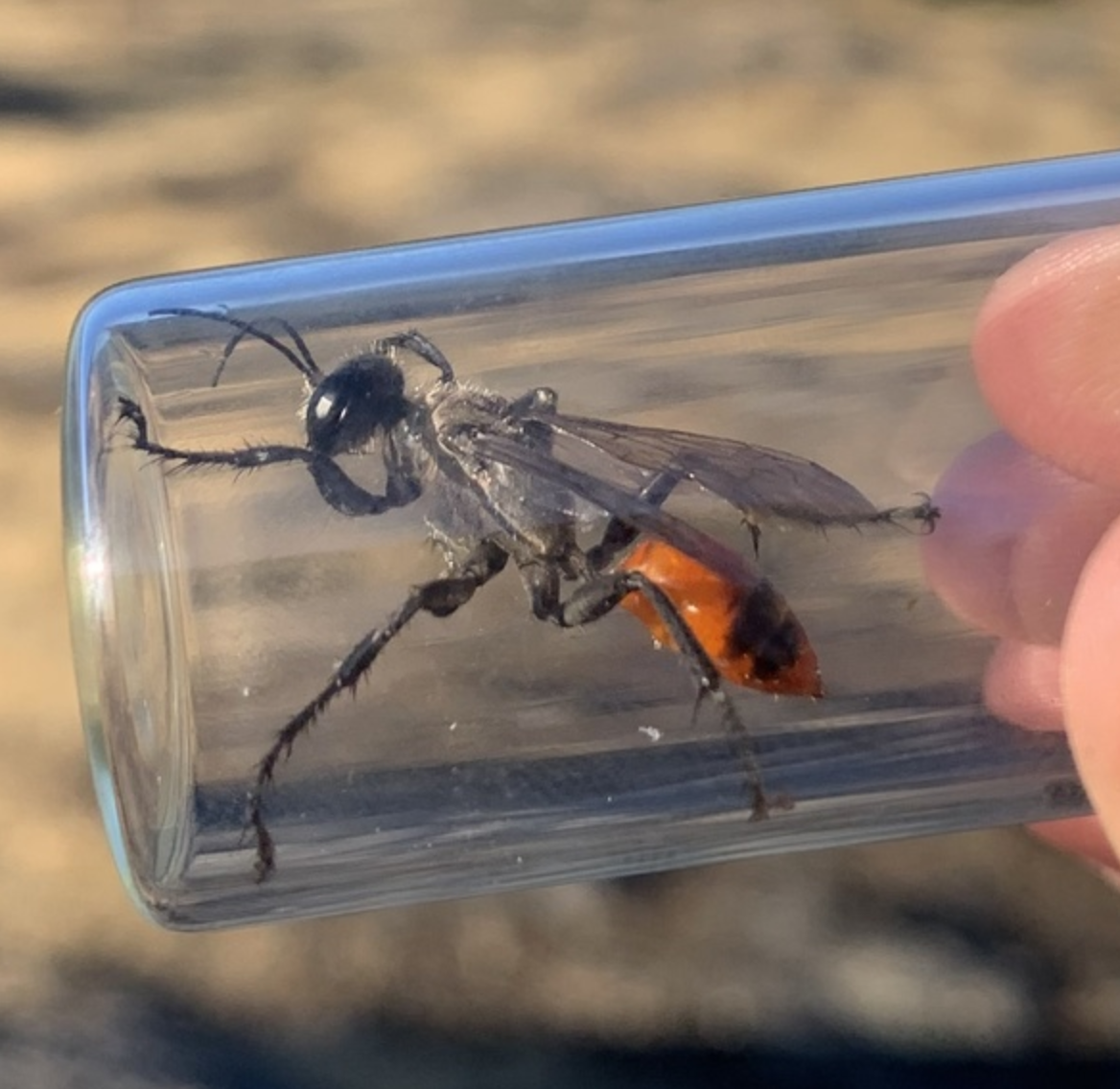

Scientific classification
- Domain: Eukaryota
- Kingdom: Animalia
- Phylum: Arthropoda
- Class: Insecta
- Order: Hymenoptera
- Family: Sphecidae
- Subfamily: Sphecinae
- Genus: Prionyx
- Species: P. canadensis

Binomial name
- Prionyx canadensis (Provancher, 1887)

Synonyms
- Chlorion canadense (Provancher, 1887); Priononyx excisus (Kohl, 1890); Sphex excisus Kohl, 1890; Sphex canadensis (Provancher, 1887); Priononyx canadensis Provancher, 1887

= Prionyx canadensis =

Species of wasp

Prionyx canadensis is a species of thread-waisted wasp in the family Sphecidae. This species can be identified by the lack of silvery hairs on the female's thorax, as present in P. parkeri and P. thomae.
