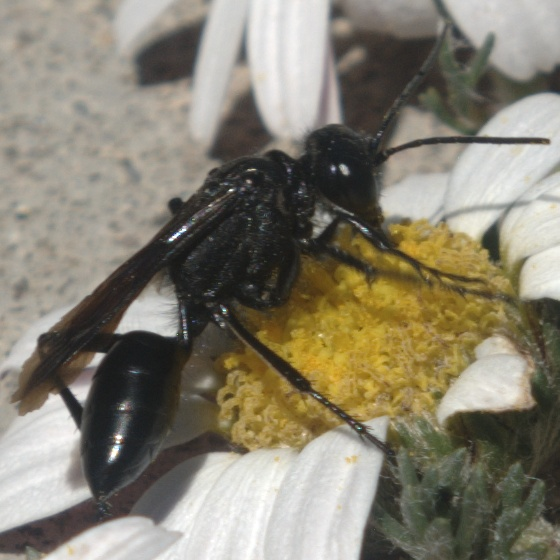
- Thread waisted Wasp

Scientific classification
- Kingdom: Animalia
- Phylum: Arthropoda
- Class: Insecta
- Order: Hymenoptera
- Family: Sphecidae
- Tribe: Prionychini
- Genus: Prionyx
- Species: P. atratus

Binomial name
- Prionyx atratus (Lepeletier de Saint Fargeau, 1845)

Synonyms
- Priononyx brunnipes Cresson, 1873; Sphex atratus Lepeletier de Saint Fargeau, 1845

= Prionyx atratus =

Species of wasp

Prionyx atratus is a species of thread-waisted wasp in the family Sphecidae.
