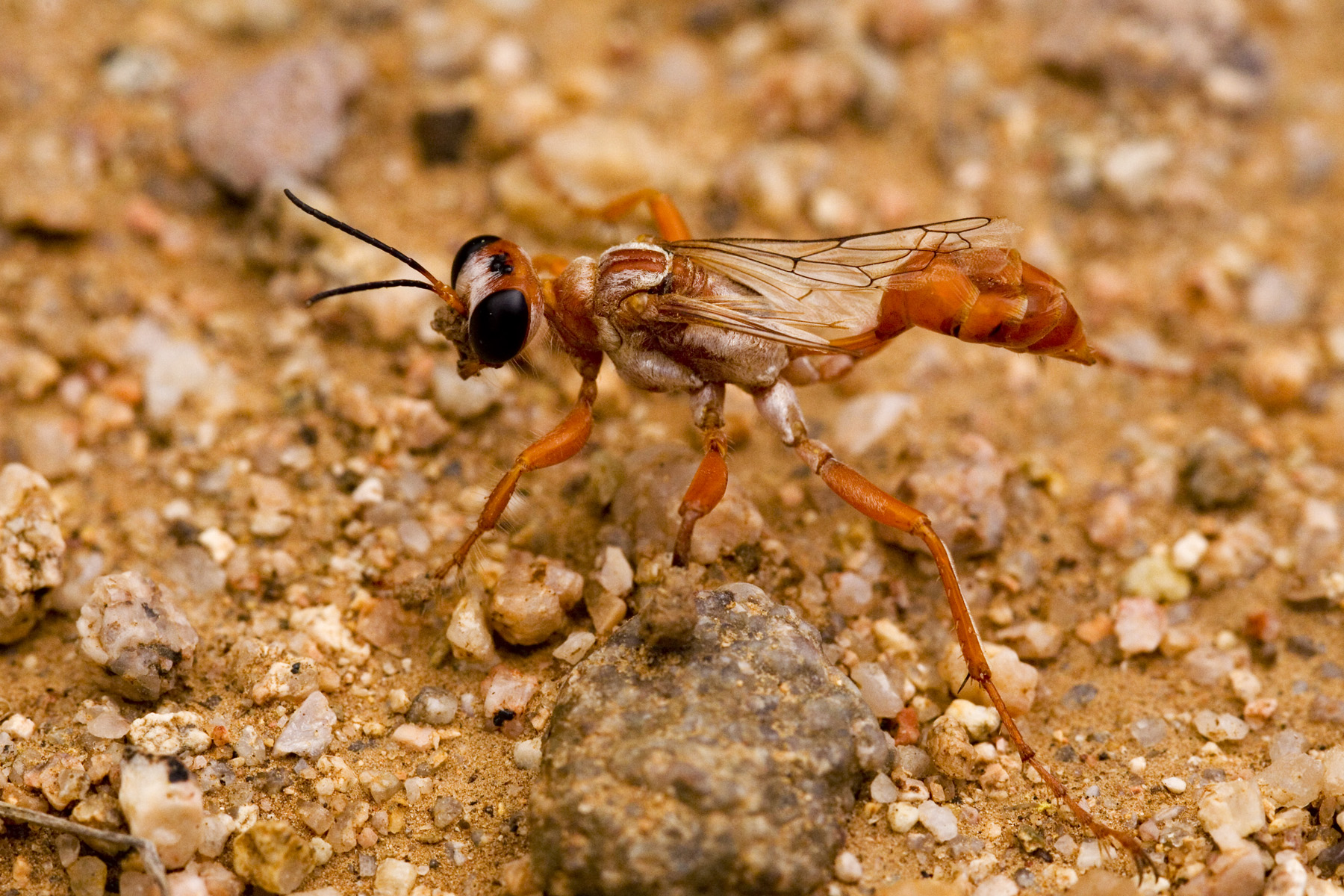

Scientific classification
- Domain: Eukaryota
- Kingdom: Animalia
- Phylum: Arthropoda
- Class: Insecta
- Order: Hymenoptera
- Family: Sphecidae
- Subfamily: Sphecinae
- Genus: Prionyx
- Species: P. foxi

Binomial name
- Prionyx foxi Bohart & Menke, 1963

= Prionyx foxi =

Species of wasp

Prionyx foxi is a species of thread-waisted wasp in the family Sphecidae.
