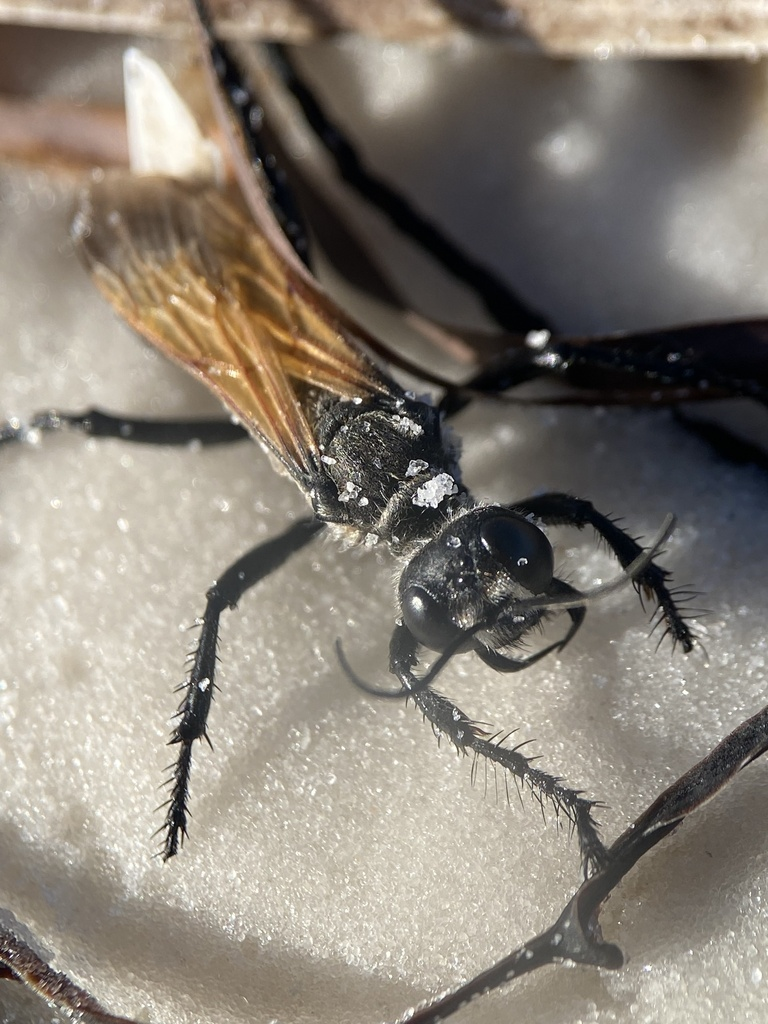

Scientific classification
- Kingdom: Animalia
- Phylum: Arthropoda
- Class: Insecta
- Order: Hymenoptera
- Family: Sphecidae
- Genus: Prionyx
- Species: P. saevus

Binomial name
- Prionyx saevus (F. Smith, 1856)

Subspecies
- P. s. harpax; P. s. saevus

= Prionyx saevus =

Species of wasp

Prionyx saevus is a species of parasitoidal thread-waisted wasp in the family Sphecidae.

== Biology ==
Females will capture prey before paralysing it, burying it underground head first, in a nest, and then laying an egg on it. The larvae develop as parasites, killing the host.

Nests of P. saevus contain multiple chambers, varying in depth of 9 to 23 cm below the surface. Nest entrances are not concealed whatsoever.
