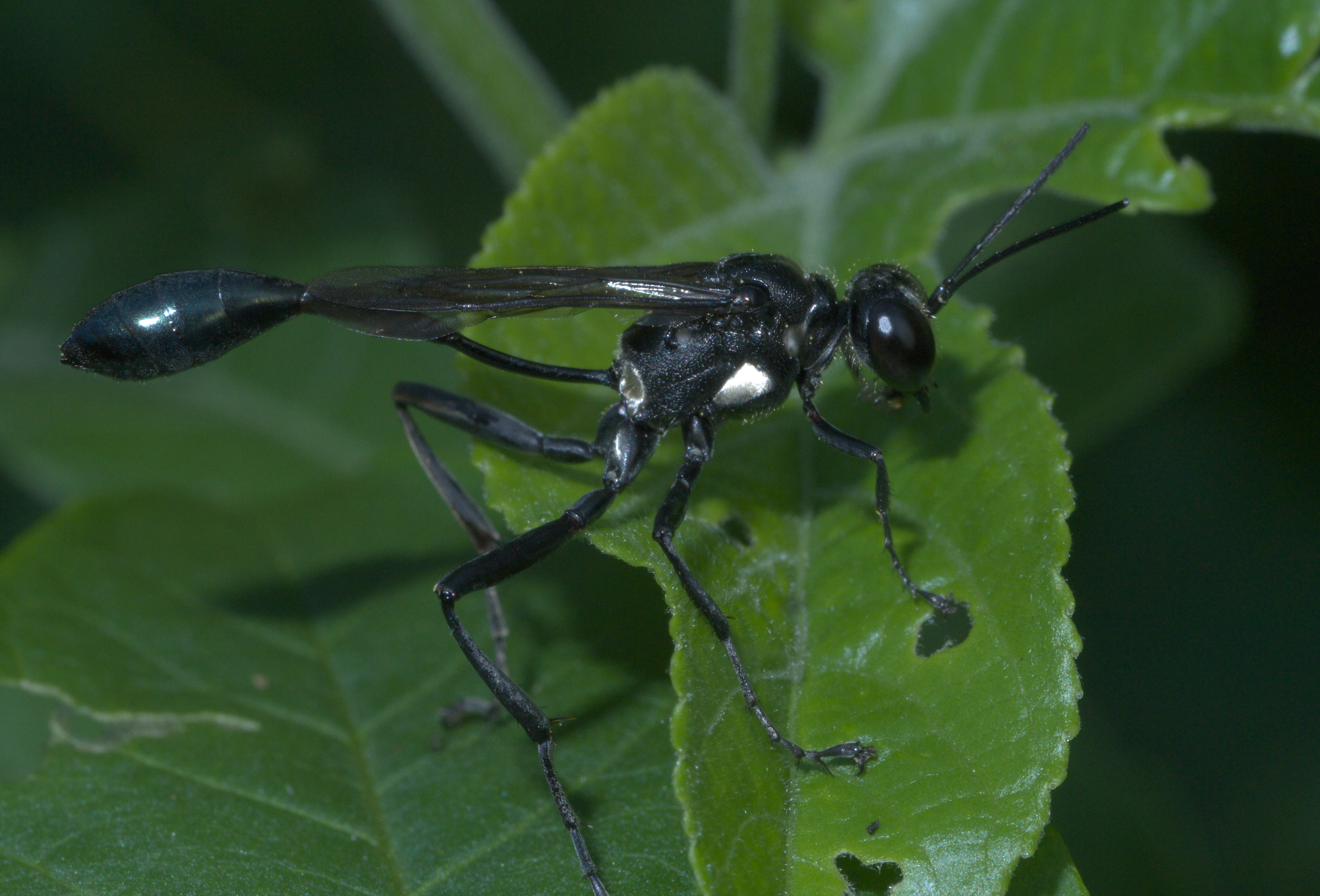
- Eremnophila aureonotata

Scientific classification
- Kingdom: Animalia
- Phylum: Arthropoda
- Class: Insecta
- Order: Hymenoptera
- Family: Sphecidae
- Subfamily: Ammophilinae
- Genus: Eremnophila; Menke, 1964

= Eremnophila =

Genus of wasps

Eremnophila is a genus of thread-waisted wasps in the family Sphecidae, found mainly in North and South America. There are about nine described species in Eremnophila.

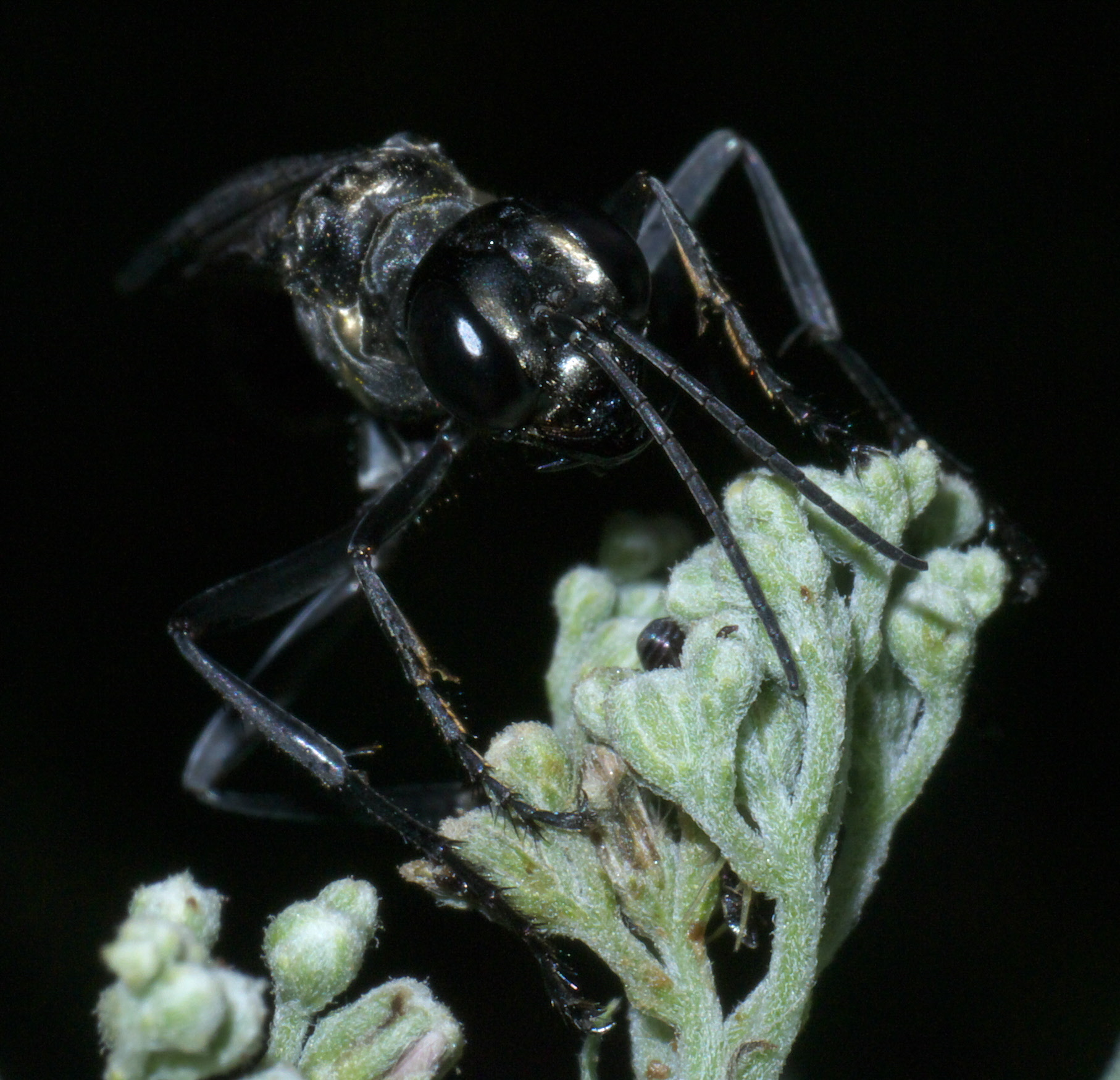
Eremnophila aureonotata

== Species ==
These nine species belong to the genus Eremnophila:

- Eremnophila asperata (W.Fox, 1897)
- Eremnophila aureonotata (Cameron, 1888)
- Eremnophila auromaculata (Pérez, 1891)
- Eremnophila binodis (Fabricius, 1798)
- Eremnophila catamarcensis (Schrottky, 1910)
- Eremnophila eximia (Lepeletier de Saint Fargeau, 1845)
- Eremnophila melanaria (Dahlbom, 1843)
- Eremnophila opulenta (Guérin-Méneville, 1838)
- Eremnophila willinki (Menke, 1964)
