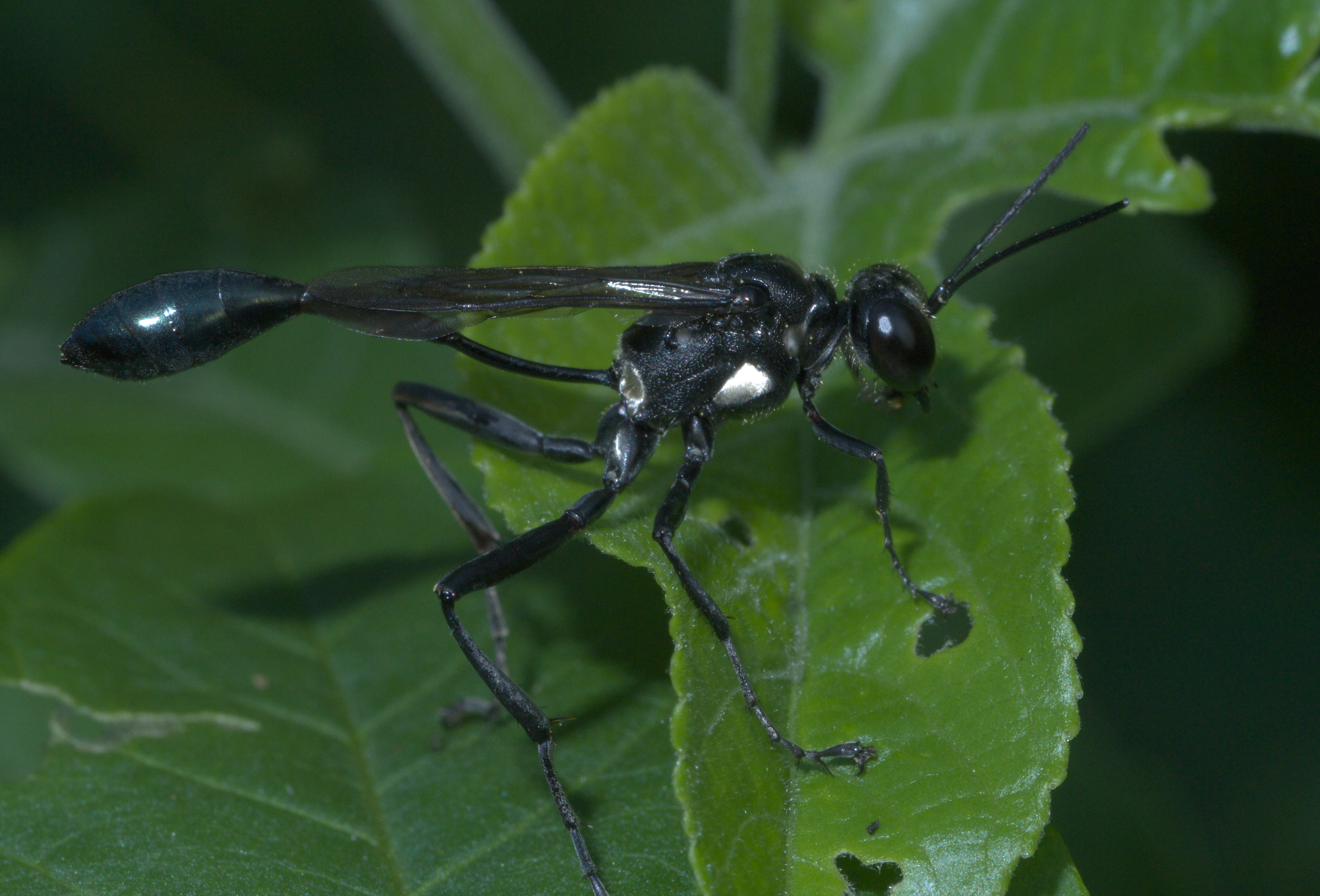

Scientific classification
- Kingdom: Animalia
- Phylum: Arthropoda
- Class: Insecta
- Order: Hymenoptera
- Family: Sphecidae
- Genus: Eremnophila
- Species: E. aureonotata

Binomial name
- Eremnophila aureonotata (Cameron, 1888)

Synonyms
- Ammophila aureonotata Cameron, 1888

= Eremnophila aureonotata =

Species of wasp

Eremnophila aureonotata, also known as the gold-marked thread-waisted wasp, is a species in the family Sphecidae ("thread-waisted wasps") found in North and South America. Their coloration is black with 2 pairs gold patches of setae one on the side of their thorax and one on the propodeum. Adults drink nectar while larvae feed on caterpillars. Females dig vertical burrows in sand or hard-packed loam to lay eggs in and provision the nests with a single caterpillar.

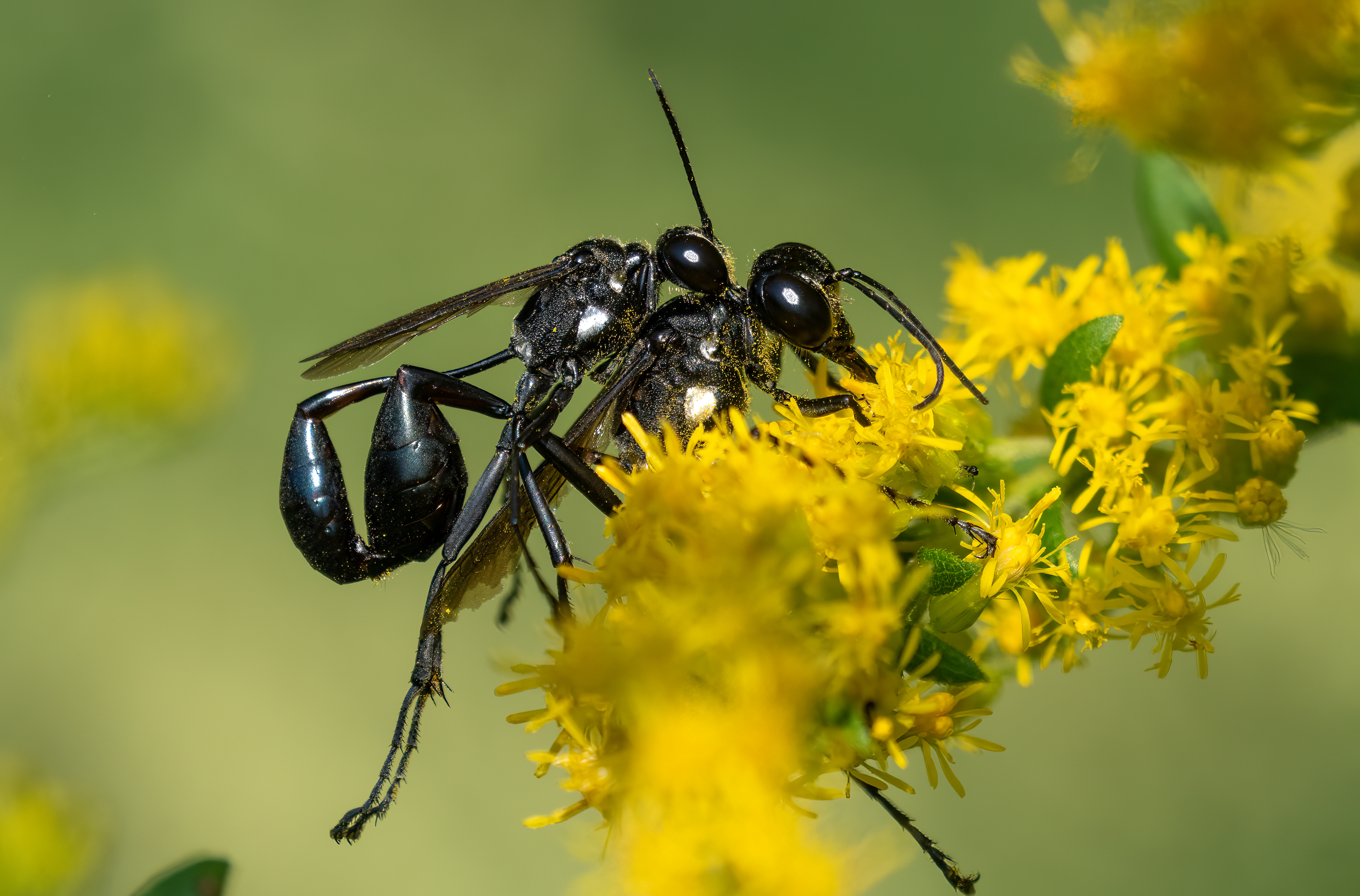
Gold marked thread-waisted wasps mating

A gold-marked thread-waisted wasp flying near blooming yellow ironweed.
