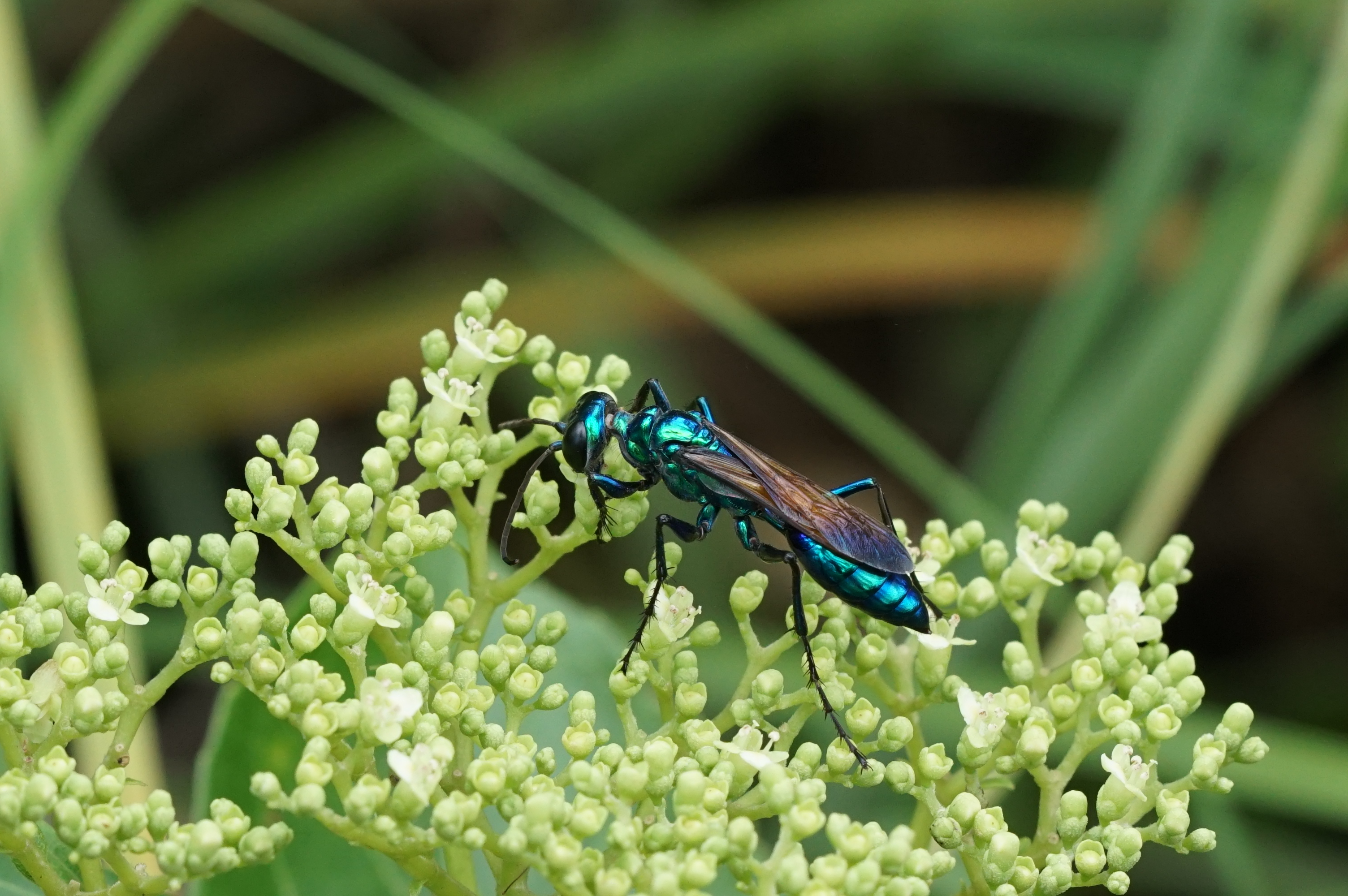
- Chlorion lobatum

Scientific classification
- Domain: Eukaryota
- Kingdom: Animalia
- Phylum: Arthropoda
- Class: Insecta
- Order: Hymenoptera
- Family: Sphecidae
- Subfamily: Chloriontinae; Fernald, 1905
- Genus: Chlorion; Latreille, 1802

Species
- About 20 species, see text

= Chlorion =

Genus of wasps

Chlorion is a genus of parasitoid wasps in the family Sphecidae. Species have been recorded from the Americas, Africa and tropical Asia through to Java; they appear to prey mostly on Orthopteran insects.

== Species ==
The Global Biodiversity Information Facility lists:

1. Chlorion aerarium Patton, 1879 Steel-blue Cricket Hunter Wasp
2. Chlorion boharti Menke, 1961
3. Chlorion consanguineum (Kohl, 1898)
4. Chlorion cyaneum Dahlbom, 1843
5. Chlorion funereum Gribodo, 1879
6. Chlorion gratiosum (F.Smith, 1856)
7. Chlorion hemiprasinum (Sichel, 1863)
8. Chlorion hemipyrrhum (Sichel, 1863)
9. Chlorion hirtum (Kohl, 1885)
10. Chlorion lobatum (Fabricius, 1775) - type species (as Sphex lobatus Fabricius, 1775)
11. Chlorion magnificum F.Morawitz, 1887
12. Chlorion maxillosum (Poiret, 1787) – African cricket hunter wasp
13. Chlorion migiurtinicum (Giordani Soika, 1941)
14. Chlorion mirandum (Kohl, 1890)
15. Chlorion regale F.Smith, 1873
16. Chlorion semenowi F.Morawitz, 1890
17. Chlorion splendidum Fabricius, 1804
18. Chlorion strandi Willink, 1951
19. Chlorion striatum Li & Yang, 1989
20. Chlorion viridicoeruleum Lepeletier de Saint Fargeau & Audinet-Serville, 1828
