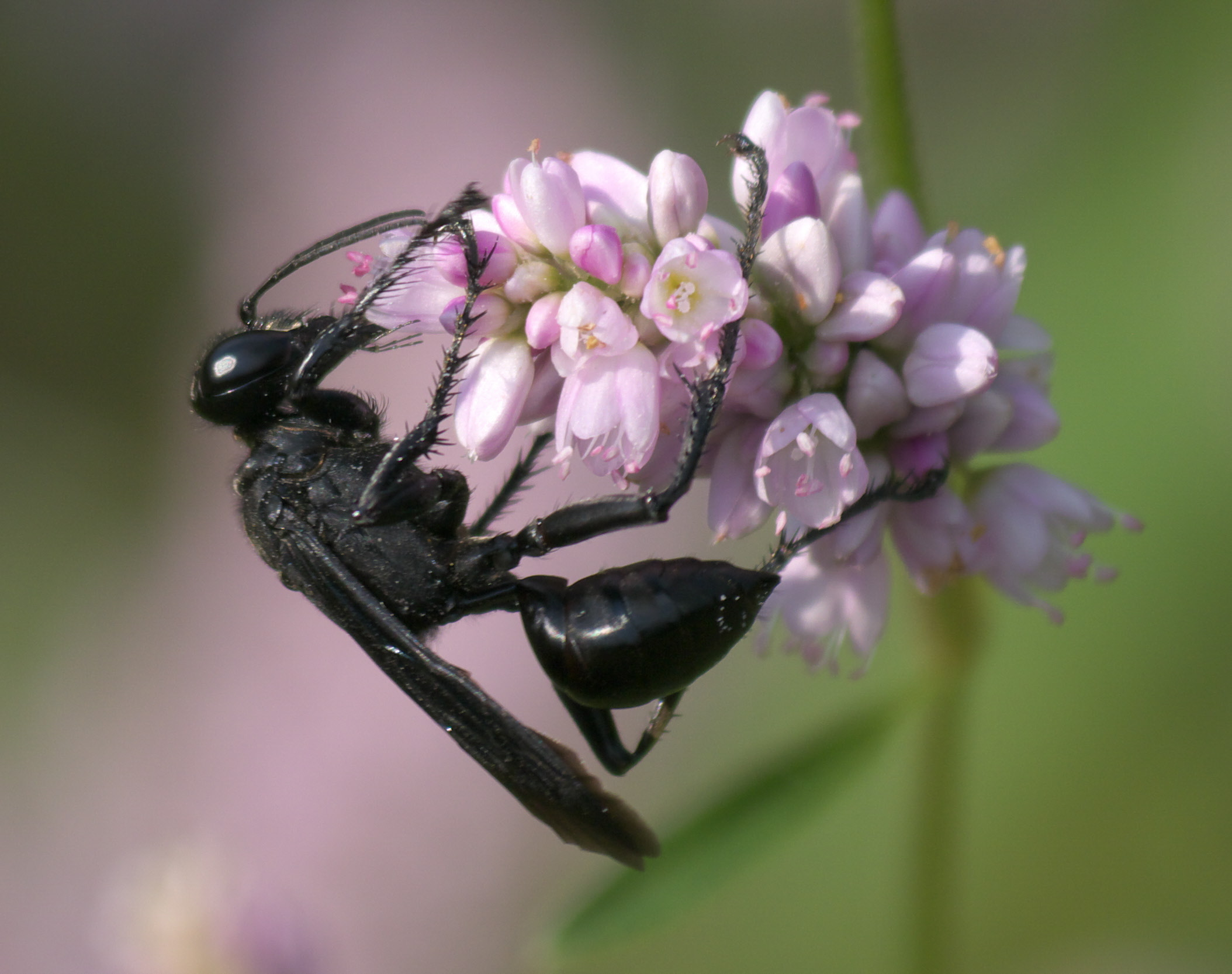

Scientific classification
- Domain: Eukaryota
- Kingdom: Animalia
- Phylum: Arthropoda
- Class: Insecta
- Order: Hymenoptera
- Family: Sphecidae
- Subfamily: Sphecinae
- Genus: Prionyx; Vander Linden, 1827

Type species
- Prionyx kirbii Vander Linden, 1827

Synonyms
- Calosphex Kohl, 1890; Enodia Dahlbom, 1843; Gastrosphaeria A. Costa, 1858; Harpactopus F. Smith, 1856; Neosphex Reed, 1894; Parasphex F. Smith, 1856; Priononyx Dahlbom, 1843; Pseudosphex Taschenberg, 1869

= Prionyx =

Genus of wasps

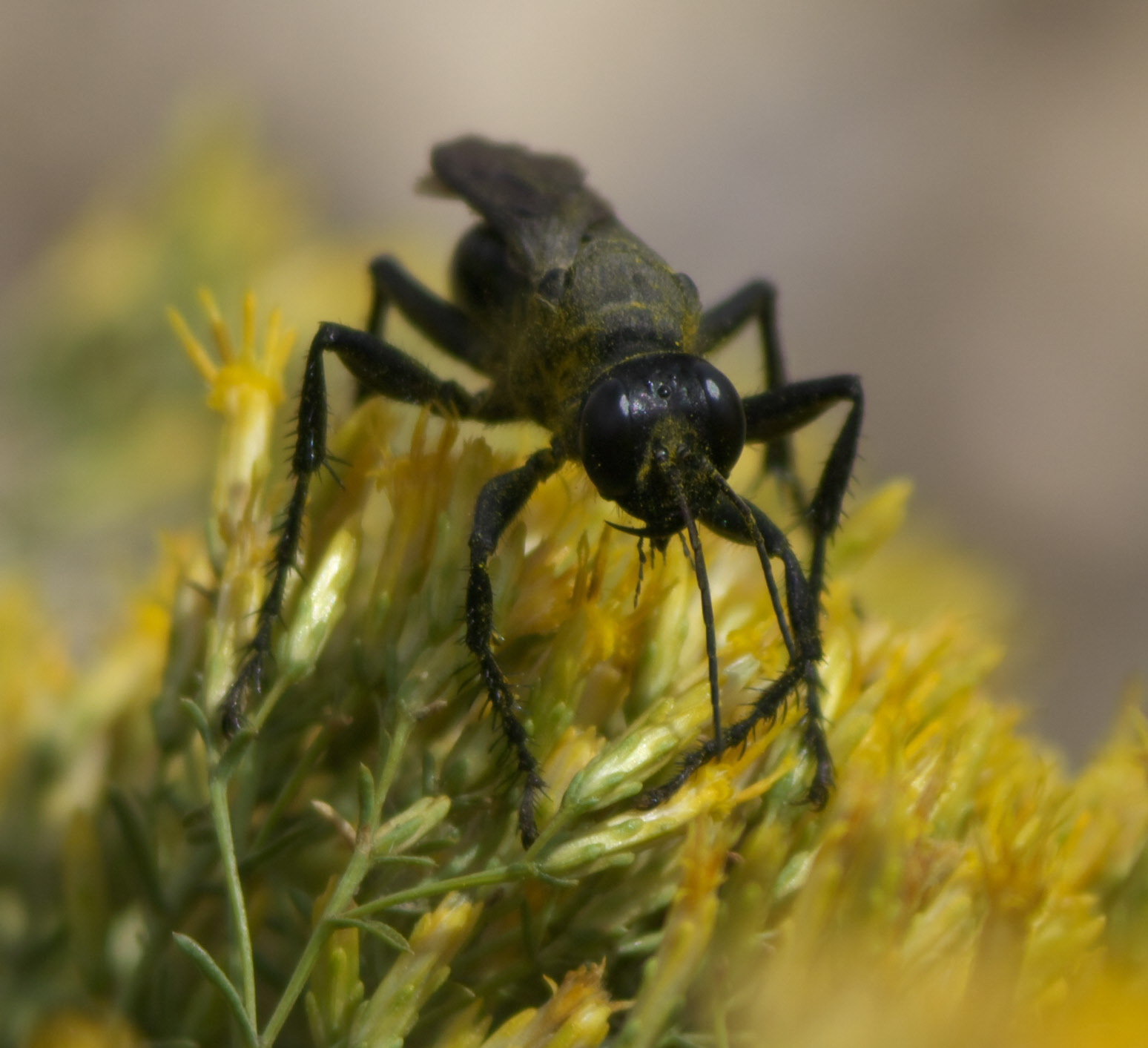

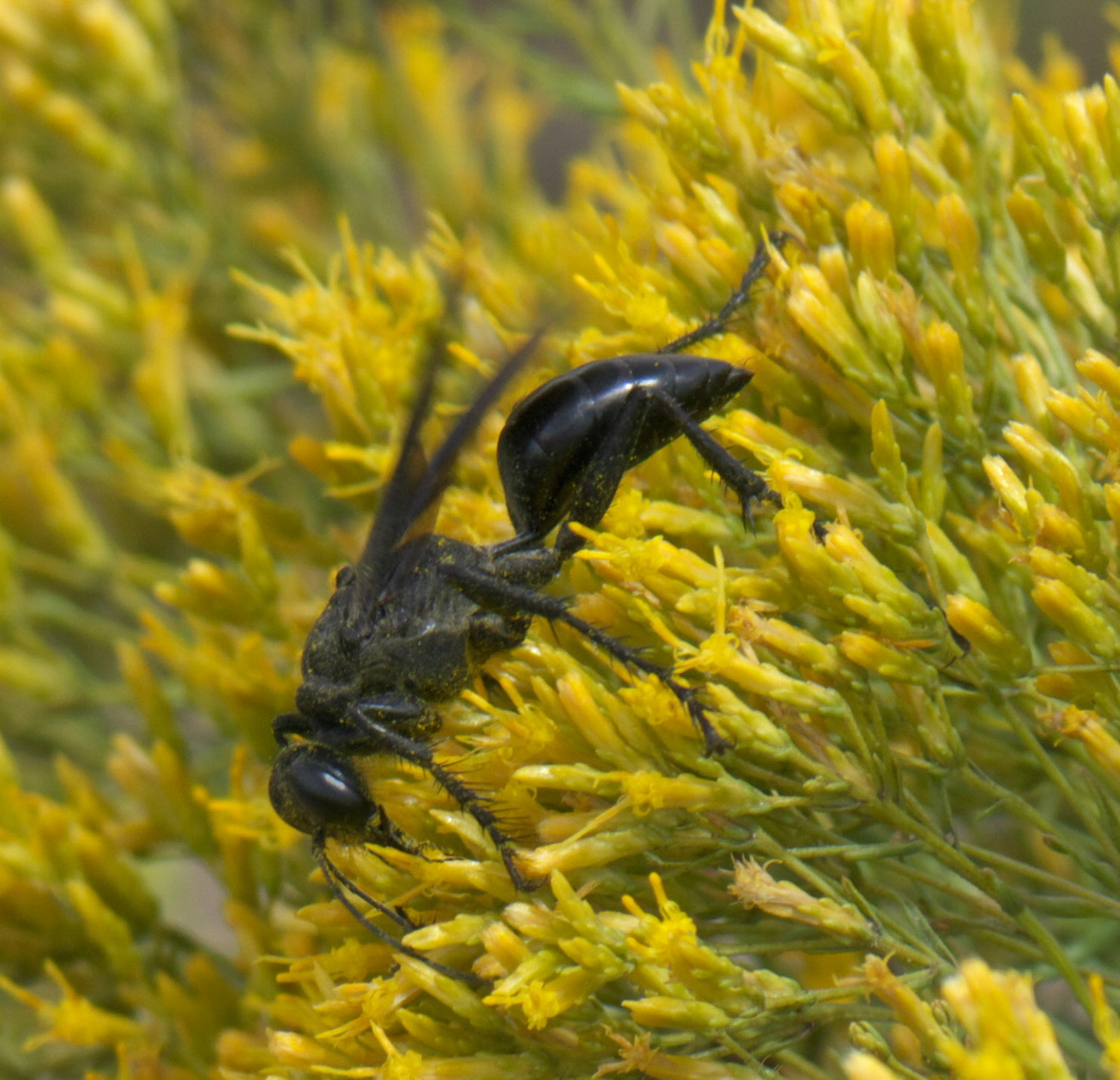

Prionyx is a genus of wasps in the family Sphecidae. They are known to hunt and feed on grasshoppers.

== Behavior ==
Prior to laying their eggs the female Prionyx stings a grasshopper causing paralysis. She will then bury the grasshopper in a burrow she has excavated, lay an egg on the body, and then seal the burrow. When the egg develops it feeds on the grasshopper until it has matured, and then pupates.

== Etymology ==
The name Prionyx comes from the Greek words "Prion" (Saw) and "Onyx/Onychus" (Claw), which refers to the saw-like endings on the creature's legs.

== Species ==
These species belong to the genus Prionyx:

- Prionyx afghaniensis (de Beaumont, 1970) ^{WPC}
- Prionyx atratus (Lepeletier de Saint Fargeau, 1845)^{i c g b}
- Prionyx bifoveolatus (Taschenberg, 1869)^{i c g}
- Prionyx binghami Jha and Farooqi, 1996^{i c g}
- Prionyx canadensis (Provancher, 1887)^{i c g b}
- Prionyx chobauti (Roth, 1925)^{i c g}
- Prionyx crudelis (F. Smith, 1856)^{i c g}
- Prionyx damascenus (de Beaumont, 1968)^{i c g}
- Prionyx elegantulus (R. Turner, 1912)^{i c g}
- Prionyx erythrogaster (Rohwer, 1913)^{i c g}
- Prionyx fervens (Linnaeus, 1758)^{i c g b}
- Prionyx foxi Bohart & Menke, 1963^{i c g b}
- Prionyx fragilis (Nurse, 1903)^{i c g}
- Prionyx funebris (Berland, 1926)^{i c g}
- Prionyx globosus (F. Smith, 1856)^{i c g}
- Prionyx gobiensis (Tsuneki, 1971)^{i c g}
- Prionyx guichardi (de Beaumont, 1967)^{i c g}
- Prionyx haberhaueri (Radoszkowski, 1871)^{i c g}
- Prionyx herrerai (Brèthes, 1926)^{i c g}
- Prionyx indus (Linnaeus, 1758)^{i c g}
- Prionyx insignis (Kohl, 1885)^{i c g}
- Prionyx judaeus (de Beaumont, 1968)^{i c g}
- Prionyx kirbii (Vander Linden, 1827)^{i c g}
- Prionyx kurdistanicus (Balthasar, 1954)^{i c g}
- Prionyx leuconotus (F. Morawitz, 1890)^{i c g}
- Prionyx lividocinctus (A. Costa, 1861)^{i c g}
- Prionyx macula (Fabricius, 1804)^{i c g}
- Prionyx melanotus (F. Morawitz, 1890)^{i c g}
- Prionyx neoxenus (Kohl, 1890)^{i c g}
- Prionyx nigropectinatus (Taschenberg, 1869)^{i c g}
- Prionyx niveatus (Dufour, 1854)^{i c g}
- Prionyx notinitidus (Willink, 1951)^{i c g}
- Prionyx nudatus (Kohl, 1885)^{i c g}
- Prionyx parkeri Bohart & Menke, 1963^{i c g b}
- Prionyx persicus (Mocsáry, 1883)^{i c g}
- Prionyx popovi Guichard, 1988^{i c g}
- Prionyx pseudostriatus (Giner Marí, 1944)^{i c g}
- Prionyx pumilio (Taschenberg, 1869)^{i c g}
- Prionyx radoszkowskyi (Kohl, 1888)^{i c g}
- Prionyx reymondi (Roth, 1954)^{i c g}
- Prionyx saevus (F. Smith, 1856)^{i c g}
- Prionyx semistriatus (Schrottky, 1920)^{i c g}
- Prionyx senegalensis (Arnold, 1951)^{i c g}
- Prionyx senilis (Morice, 1911)^{i c g}
- Prionyx sennae (Mantero, 1901)^{i c g}
- Prionyx simillimus (Fernald, 1907)^{i c g}
- Prionyx sirdariensis (Radoszkowski, 1877)^{i c g}
- Prionyx songaricus (Eversmann, 1849)^{i c g}
- Prionyx spinolae (F. Smith, 1856)^{i c g WPC}*
- Prionyx stschurowskii (Radoszkowski, 1877)^{i c g}
- Prionyx subatratus (R. Bohart, 1958)^{i c g}
- Prionyx subfuscatus (Dahlbom, 1845)^{i c g}
- Prionyx sundewalli (Dahlbom, 1845)^{i c g}
- Prionyx thomae (Fabricius, 1775)^{i c g}
- Prionyx trichargyrus (Spinola, 1839)^{i c g}
- Prionyx viduatus (Christ, 1791)^{i c g}
- Prionyx vittatus (Kohl, 1884)^{i c g}
- Prionyx xanthabdominalis Li and Yang, 1995^{i c g}
- Prionyx zarudnyi (Gussakovskij, 1933)^{i c g}

Data sources: i = ITIS, c = Catalogue of Life, g = GBIF, b = Bugguide.net WPC = Wojciech J. Pulawski's Catalog (Accessed March, 2025, but not in ITIS etc using same older source from 2019)

- Note: As a proposed replacement name for preoccupied Sphex chilensis Spinola, 1851, as used later by various authors, but in several sources as e.g. Prionyx chilensis (Spinola, 1851), e.g. after Amarante, 2002)
