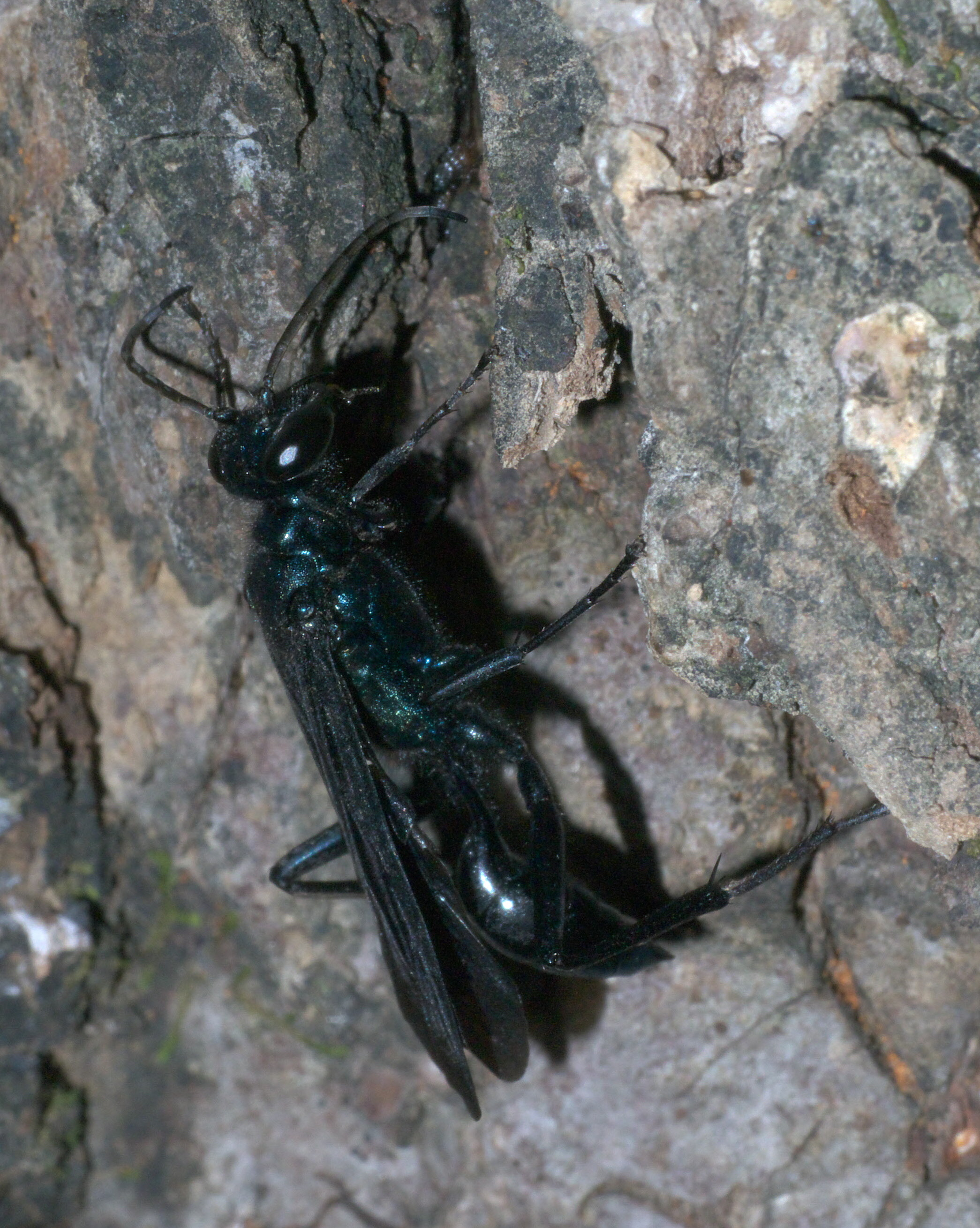
- Chalybion californicum

Scientific classification
- Kingdom: Animalia
- Phylum: Arthropoda
- Clade: Pancrustacea
- Class: Insecta
- Order: Hymenoptera
- Family: Sphecidae
- Subfamily: Sceliphrinae; Ashmead, 1899

Tribes
- Podiini de Saussure, 1892; Sceliphrini Ashmead, 1899; †Protosceliphrini Antropov, 2014

= Sceliphrinae =

Subfamily of wasps

Sceliphrinae is a subfamily of thread-waisted wasps in the family Sphecidae.

== Genera ==
There are six extant genera and two fossil genera belonging to the subfamily Sceliphrinae. There are 151 extant species and 4 fossil species of Sceliphrinae as follows:

=== Tribe Podiini de Saussure, 1892 ===
- Dynatus Lepeletier, 1845 (3 spp.)
- Penepodium Menke in R. Bohart and Menke, 1976 (22 spp.)
- Podium Fabricius, 1804 (23 spp.)
- Trigonopsis Perty, 1833 (16 spp.)

=== Tribe Sceliphrini Ashmead, 1899 ===
- Chalybion Dahlbom, 1843 (54 +1† spp.) - blue mud-dauber wasps
- Sceliphron Klug, 1801 (33 +1† spp.) - black-and-yellow mud-dauber wasps
- †Hoplisidia Cockerell, 1906 (1† sp.)

=== Tribe †Protosceliphrini Antropov, 2014 ===
- †Protosceliphron Antropov, 2014 (1† sp.)

== Gallery ==
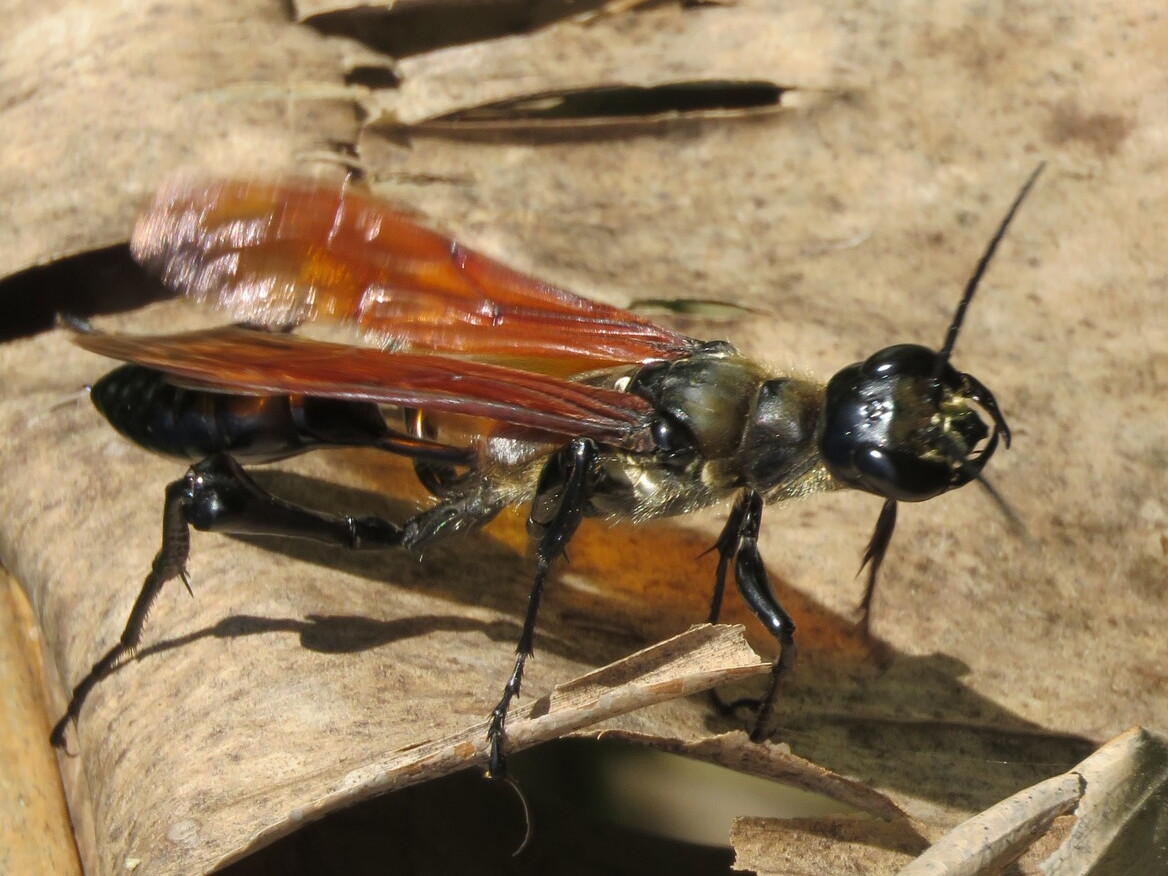
Tribe Podiini: Dynatus nigripes

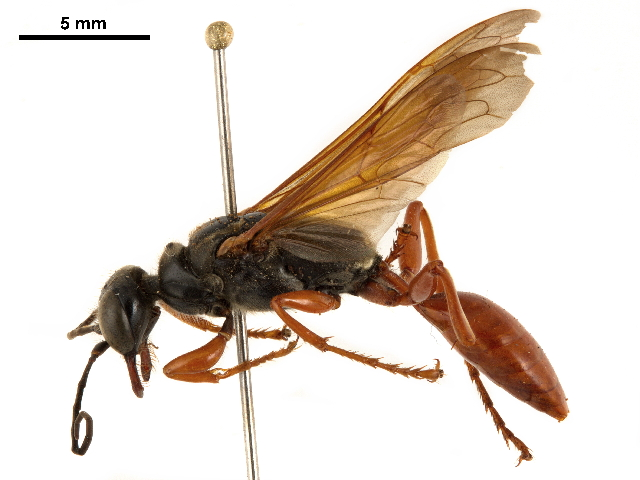
Tribe Podiini: Penepodium luteipenne

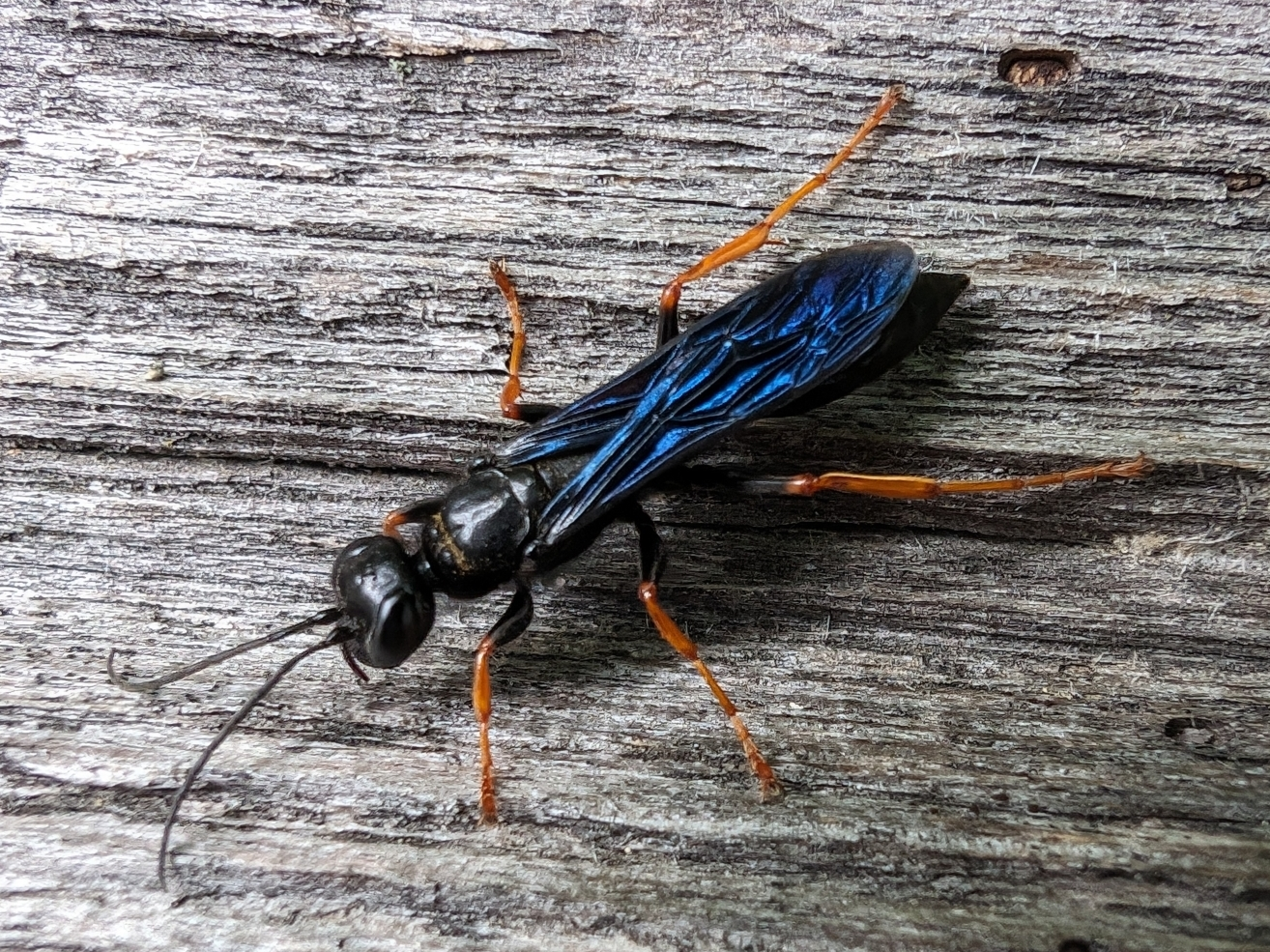
Tribe Podiini: Podium luctuosum

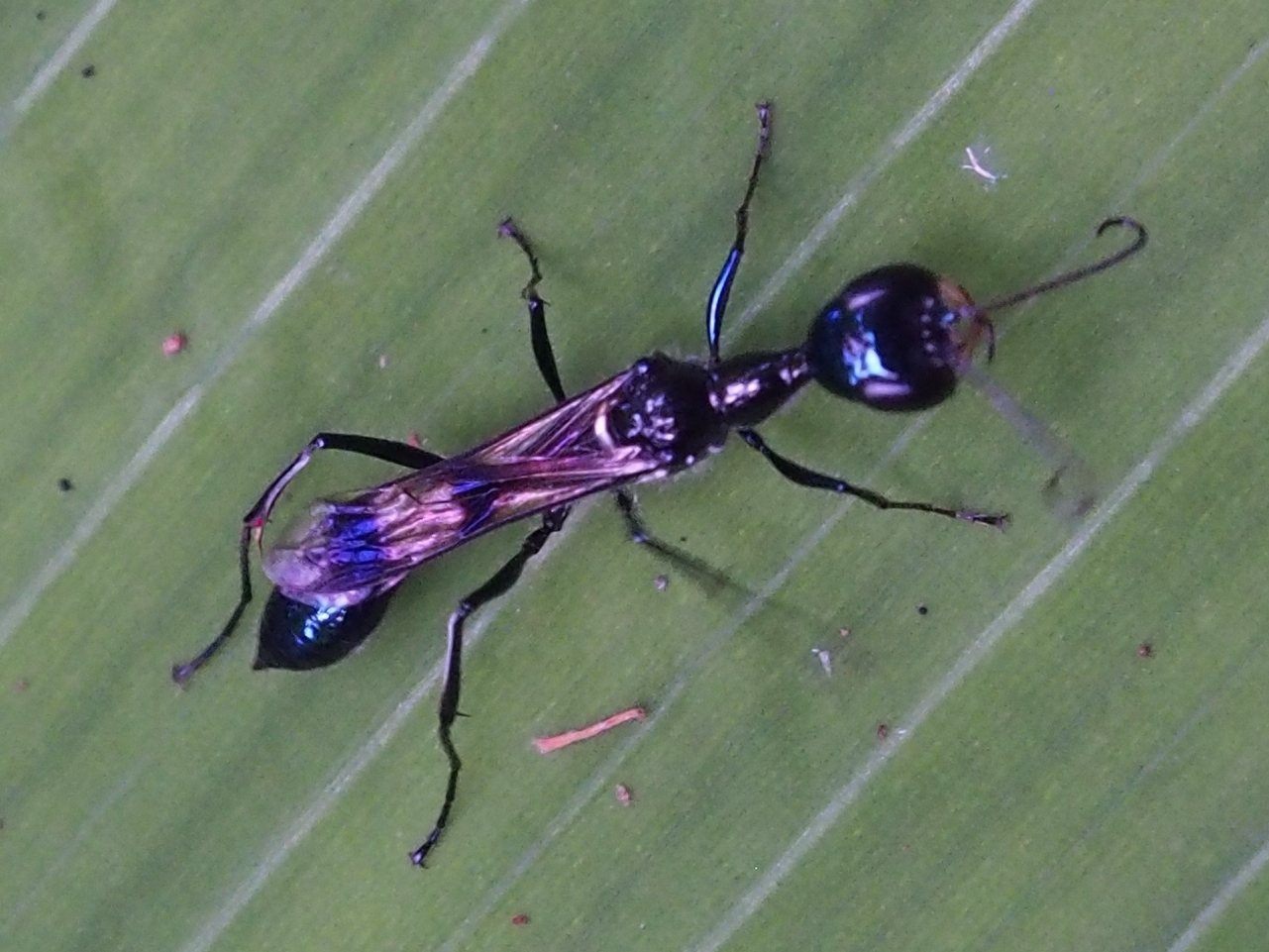
Tribe Podiini: Trigonopsis cameronii

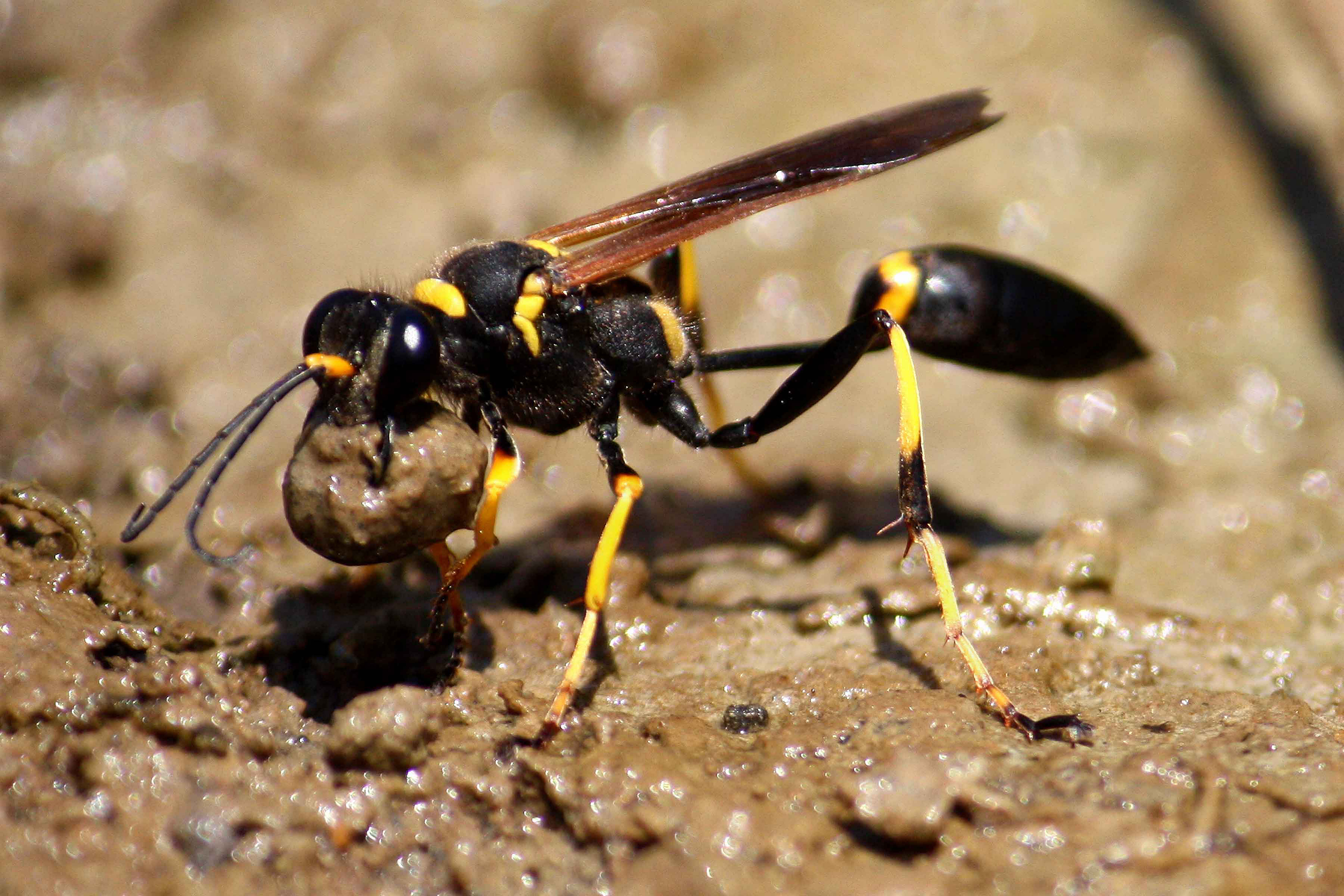
Tribe Sceliphrini: Sceliphron caementarium

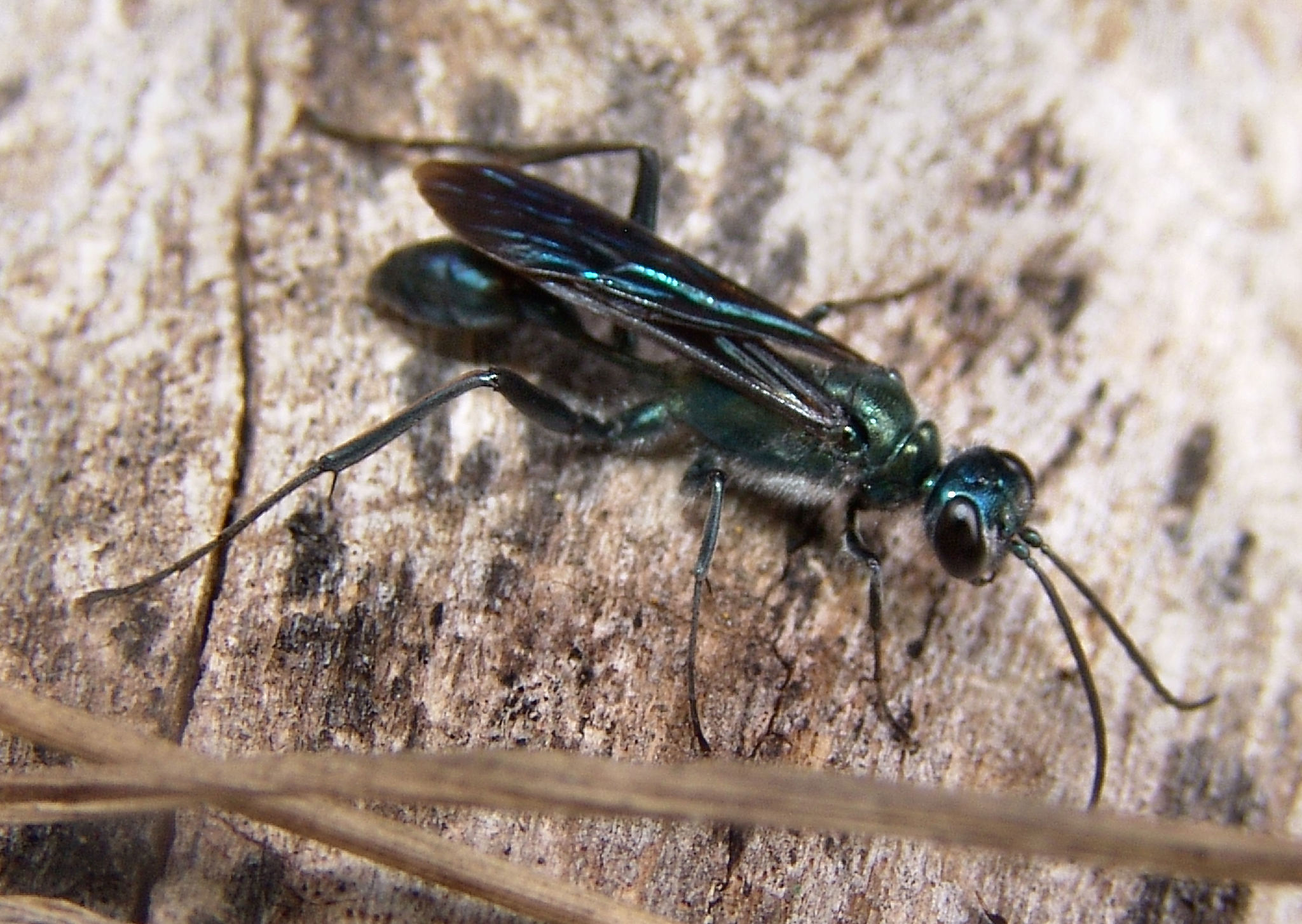
Tribe Sceliphrini: Chalybion zimmermanni zimmermanni
