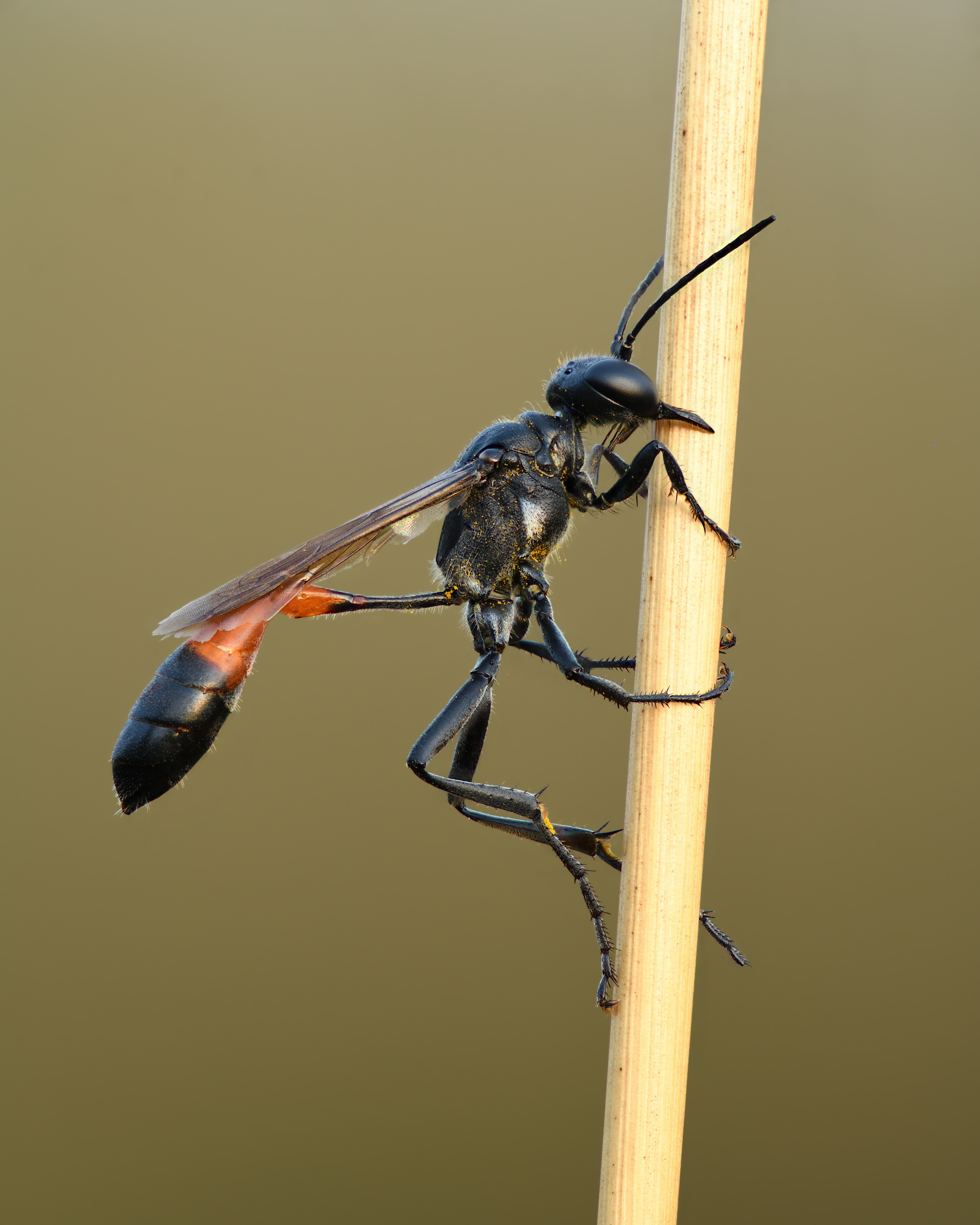
- Ammophila pubescens

Scientific classification
- Kingdom: Animalia
- Phylum: Arthropoda
- Class: Insecta
- Order: Hymenoptera
- Superfamily: Apoidea
- Family: Sphecidae (Latreille, 1802)

Subfamilies
- Ammophilinae; Chloriontinae; Sceliphrinae; Sphecinae

= Sphecidae =

Family of wasps

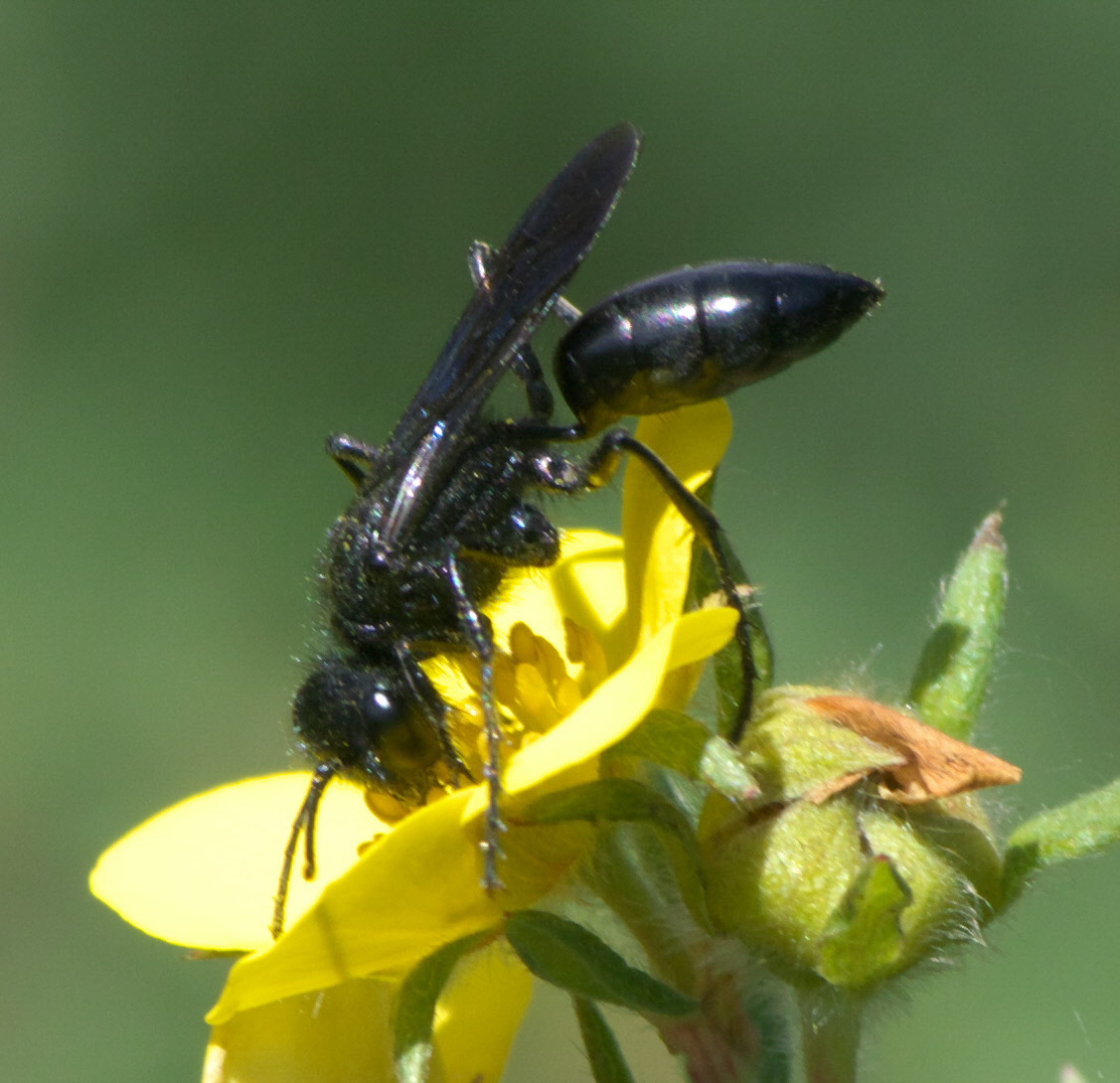
Podalonia sp.

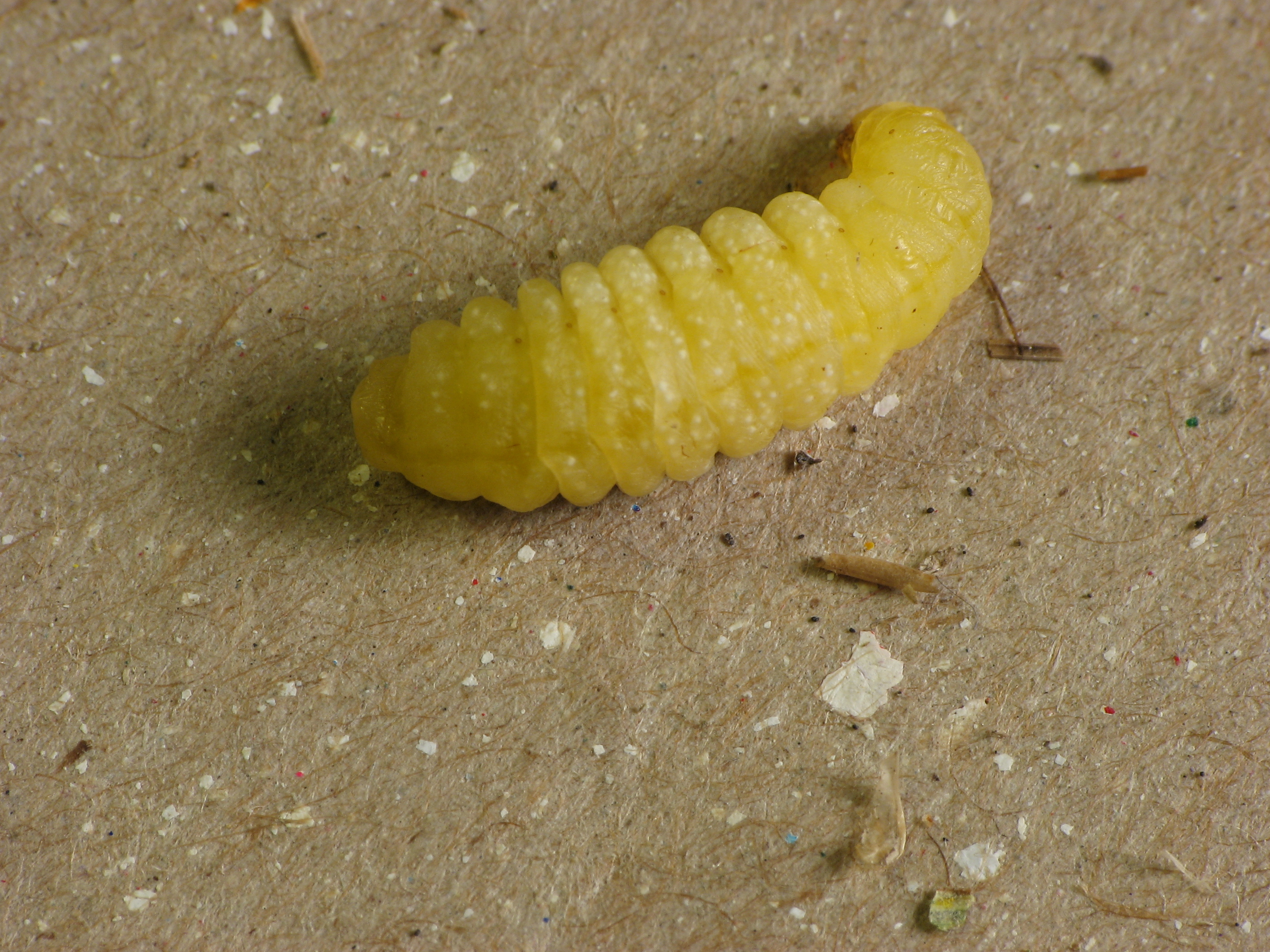
Isodontia larva

The Sphecidae are a cosmopolitan family of wasps of the suborder Apocrita that includes sand wasps, mud daubers, and other thread-waisted wasps.

The name Sphecidae was formerly given to a much larger grouping of wasps. This was found to be paraphyletic, so most of the old subfamilies have been moved to the Crabronidae.

== Biology ==
The biology of the Sphecidae, even under the restricted definition, is still fairly diverse; some sceliphrines even display rudimentary forms of sociality, and some sphecines rear multiple larvae in a single large brood cell. Many nest in pre-existing cavities, or dig simple burrows in the soil, but some species construct free-standing nests of mud and even (in one genus) resin. All are predatory and parasitoidal, but the type of prey ranges from spiders to various dictyopterans, orthopteroids and larvae of either Lepidoptera or other Hymenoptera; the vast majority practice mass provisioning, providing all the prey items prior to laying the egg.

== Phylogeny ==
This phylogenetic tree is based on Sann et al., 2018, which used phylogenomics to demonstrate that both the bees (Anthophila) and the Sphecidae arose from within the former Crabronidae, which is therefore paraphyletic, and which they suggested should be split into several families; the former family Heterogynaidae nests within the Bembicidae, as here defined. These findings differ in several details from studies published by two other sets of authors in 2017, though all three studies demonstrate a paraphyletic "Crabronidae."

- Apoidea
  - Ampulicidae
  - - Astatidae
    - - - Bembicidae
        - - Sphecidae (sensu stricto)
          - - - Crabronidae (sensu stricto)
              - Mellinidae
      - - - Pemphredonidae
          - Philanthidae
        - - Psenidae
          - - - Ammoplanidae
              - Anthophila (bees)

=== Family Sphecidae (sensu stricto) ===
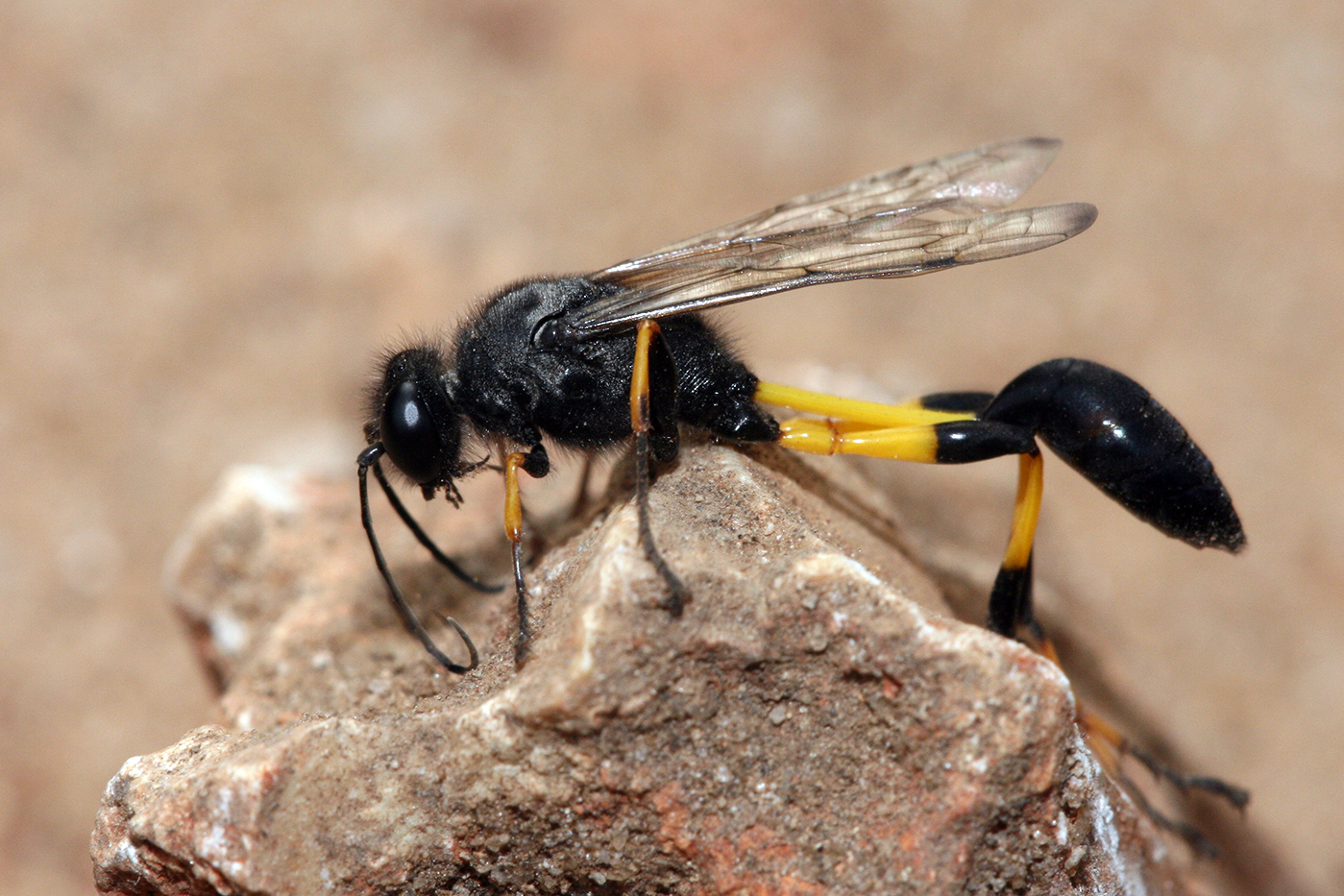
Sceliphrinae: Sceliphron spirifex

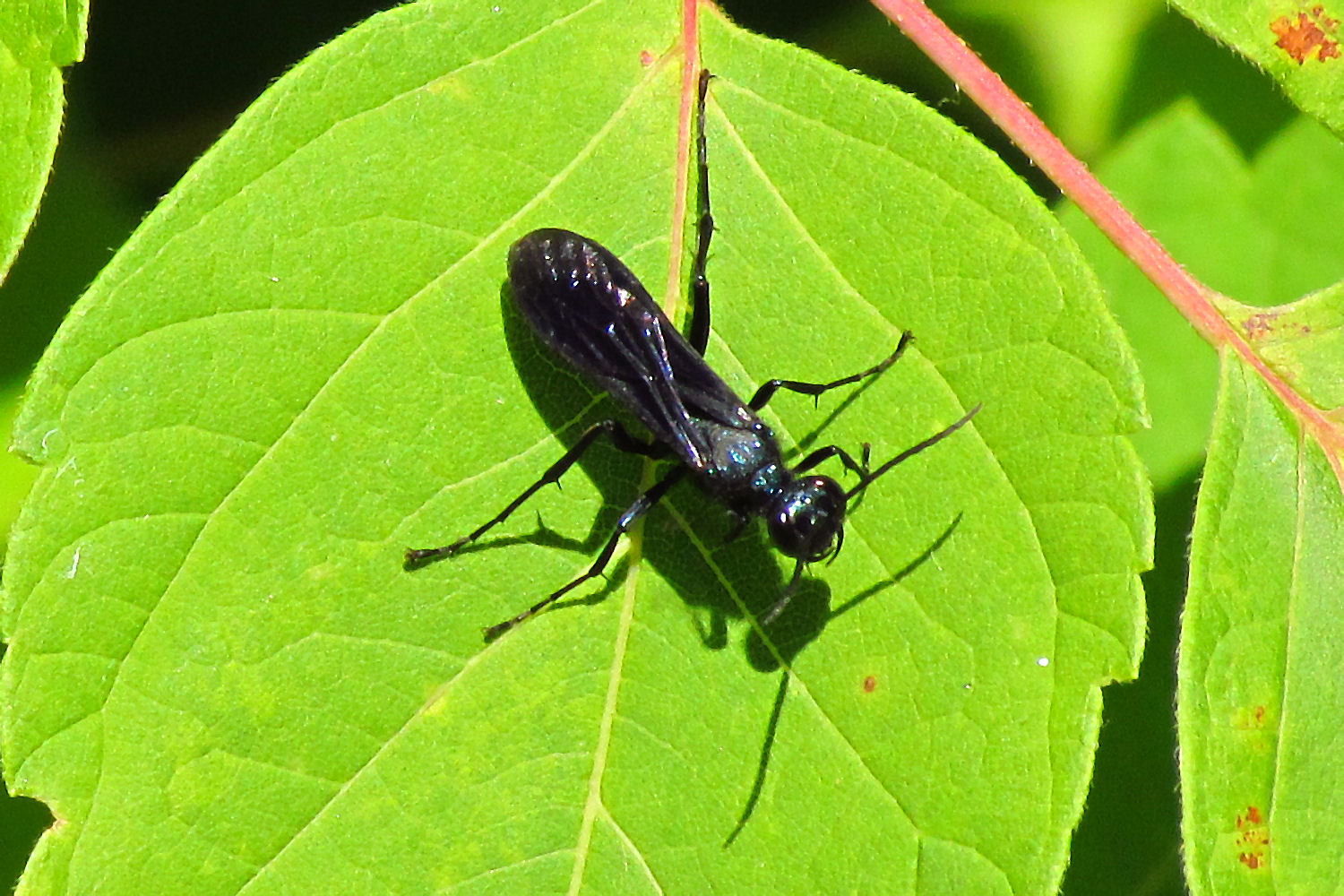
Sceliphrinae: Chalybion californicum

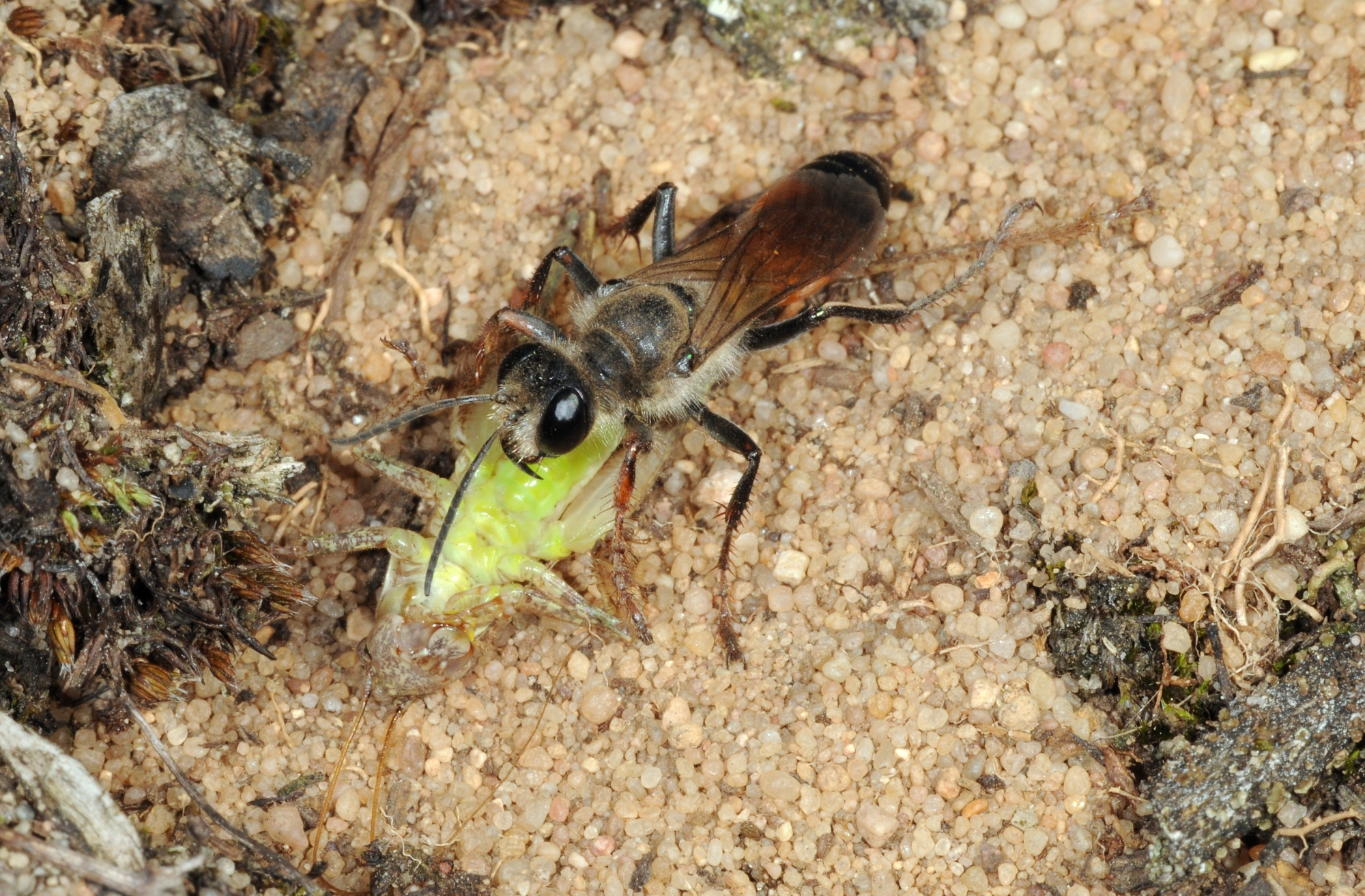
Sphecinae: Sphex funerarius with prey

A gold-marked thread-waisted wasp flying near blooming yellow ironweed.

A Sphecidae wasp, probably Sceliphron caementarium, investigates two squash bugs, but doesn’t attempt capture to provision its nest.

Great golden digger wasp on narrow leaf milkweed. Part is shown at one tenth speed.

The old digger wasp family Sphecidae (sensu lato) was paraphyletic and has been broken up. Only the following subfamilies remain in the new family Sphecidae (sensu stricto) which is a monophyletic clade.

Subfamily Ammophilinae

- Ammophila W. Kirby, 1798
- Eremnophila Menke, 1964
- Eremochares Gribodo, 1883
- Hoplammophila de Beaumont, 1960
- Parapsammophila Taschenberg, 1869
- Podalonia Fernald, 1927

Subfamily Chloriontinae

- Chlorion Latreille, 1802

Subfamily Sceliphrinae

- Chalybion Dahlbom, 1843
- Dynatus Lepeletier de Saint Fargeau, 1845
- †Hoplisidia Cockerell, 1906
- Penepodium Menke, 1976
- Podium Fabricius, 1804
- †Protosceliphron Antropov, 2014
- Sceliphron Klug, 1801
- Trigonopsis Perty, 1833

Subfamily Sphecinae

- Chilosphex Menke, 1976
- Isodontia Patton, 1880
- Palmodes Kohl, 1890
- Prionyx Vander Linden, 1827
- Sphex Linnaeus, 1758
- Stangeella Menke, 1962

Both of the historical definitions of the Sphecidae (a conservative one, where all the sphecoid wasps other than ampulicids and heterogynaids were in a single large family, and a more refined one, where the seven large sphecid subfamilies were each elevated to family rank) have recently been shown to be paraphyletic, and the most recent classification is closer to the refined scheme; there are now seven families in addition to the Sphecidae and Crabronidae, all of which were formerly placed within Sphecidae.

=== Family Crabronidae ===
All the other digger wasp taxa that were formerly included in Sphecidae (sensu lato) were placed in the family Crabronidae, which was itself paraphyletic, and recent classifications have split Crabronidae into a number of smaller families, mostly formerly treated as subfamilies.

== Sources ==
- Goulet, H., Huber, J.T. (1993) Hymenoptera of the World. Agriculture Canada Research Branch, publication 1894/E. 668pp.
