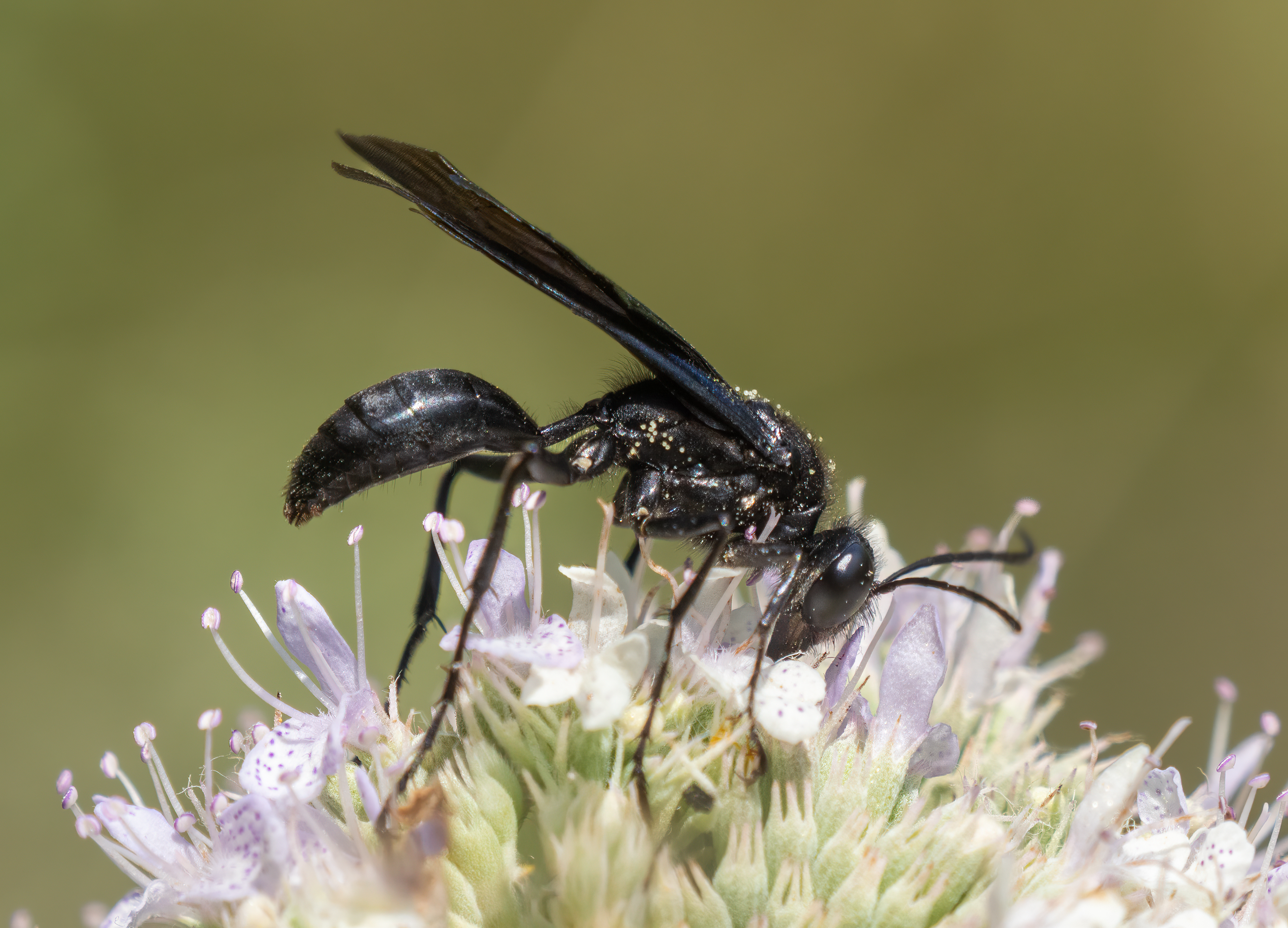

Scientific classification
- Kingdom: Animalia
- Phylum: Arthropoda
- Class: Insecta
- Order: Hymenoptera
- Family: Sphecidae
- Genus: Sphex
- Species: S. pensylvanicus

Binomial name
- Sphex pensylvanicus Linnaeus, 1763

Synonyms
- Sphex pensylvanica Linnaeus, 1763 (inaccurate gender); Ammobia pensylvanica (Linnaeus, 1763); Chlorion pensylvanicum (Linnaeus, 1763)

= Sphex pensylvanicus =

Species of wasp

Sphex pensylvanicus, the great black wasp or great black digger wasp, is a species of digger wasp. It lives across most of North America and grows to a size of 20–35 mm (0.8–1.4 in). The larvae feed on living insects that the females paralyze and carry to the underground nest.

== Distribution ==
S. pensylvanicus is distributed across most of the contiguous United States and northern Mexico. During the late 20th century, its range expanded north to New York and the Canadian provinces of Quebec and Ontario.

== Description ==
Sphex pensylvanicus is a large, black wasp, significantly larger than their congener Sphex ichneumoneus (the great golden digger wasp). Males are smaller than females, at only 19–28 mm (0.7–1.1 in) long compared with typical female sizes of 25–34 mm (1.0–1.3 in). According to John Bartram, "The sting of this Wasp is painful, but does not swell like others". As well as being larger than S. ichneumoneus, they are also darker, with an entirely black body and smoky wings with a blue iridescence, where S. ichneumoneus has yellow wings, red legs, and a partly red abdomen.

== Ecology and life cycle ==
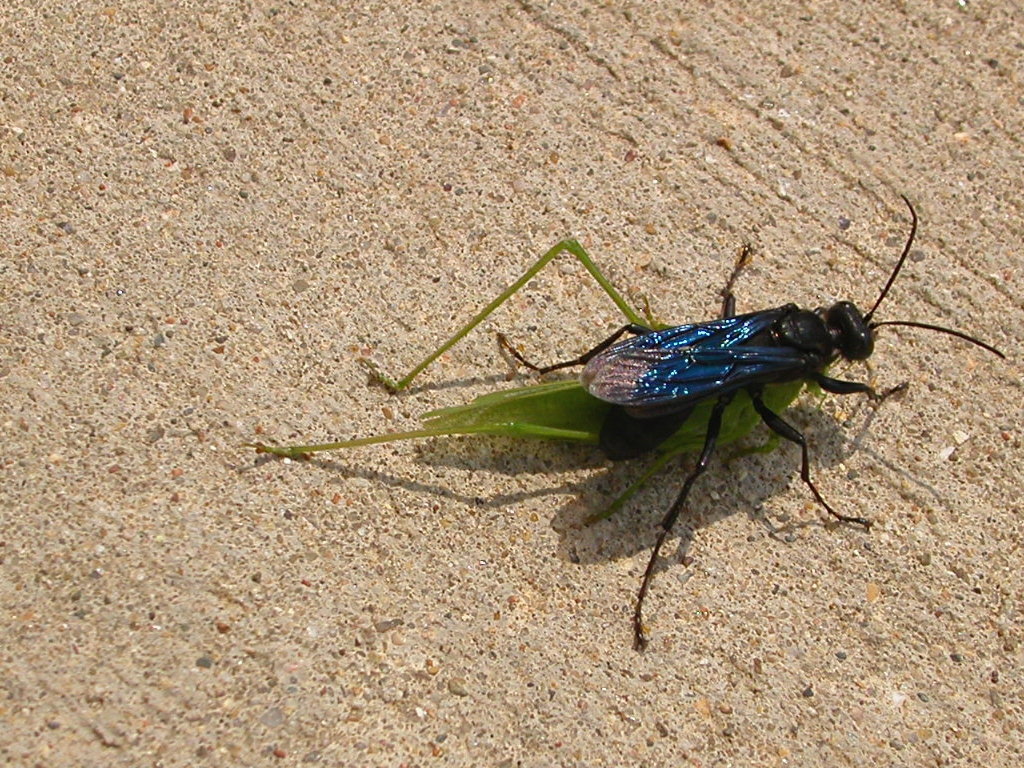
Sphex pensylvanicus on a katydid

Adult females of S. pensylvanicus build an underground nest which they provision with various orthopteran insects, particularly of the genera Microcentrum, Amblycorypha and Scudderia. Prey are stung three times, once in the neck and twice in the thorax, and are paralyzed by the wasp's sting, although they can survive for weeks. The prey are then carried to the nest. While collecting their prey, the females are vulnerable to kleptoparasitism, in which birds, including the house sparrow (Passer domesticus) and the grey catbird (Dumetella carolinensis), steal the prey that the wasp has collected.

The eggs of S. pensylvanicus are 5–6 mm (0.20–0.24 in) long and 1 mm (0.04 in) wide; they are glued to the underside of the prey insect between the first and second pairs of legs. Each of the several chambers in the nest houses a single larva, which consumes 2–6 katydids or grasshoppers. The larval stage lasts 10 days, reaching a pre-pupation size of 30–35 mm (1.2–1.4 in) long by 7–10 mm (0.28–0.39 in) wide.

S. pensylvanicus is an important pollinator of plants including the milkweeds Asclepias syriaca and A. incarnata. It has also been reported on Daucus carota, Eryngium yuccifolium, Melilotus albus, Monarda punctata , and Pycnanthemum virginianum S. pensylvanicus is one of several species of Sphex to be parasitized by the strepsipteran Paraxenos westwoodi.

== Taxonomic history ==
Sphex pensylvanicus was the subject of the first article on an insect written by a native-born citizen of the New World, when observations made by John Bartram on S. pensylvanicus were presented to the Royal Society in 1749 by Peter Collinson. Sphex pensylvanicus was described by Carl Linnaeus in his 1763 work Centuria Insectorum, using material sent to him by Charles De Geer.
