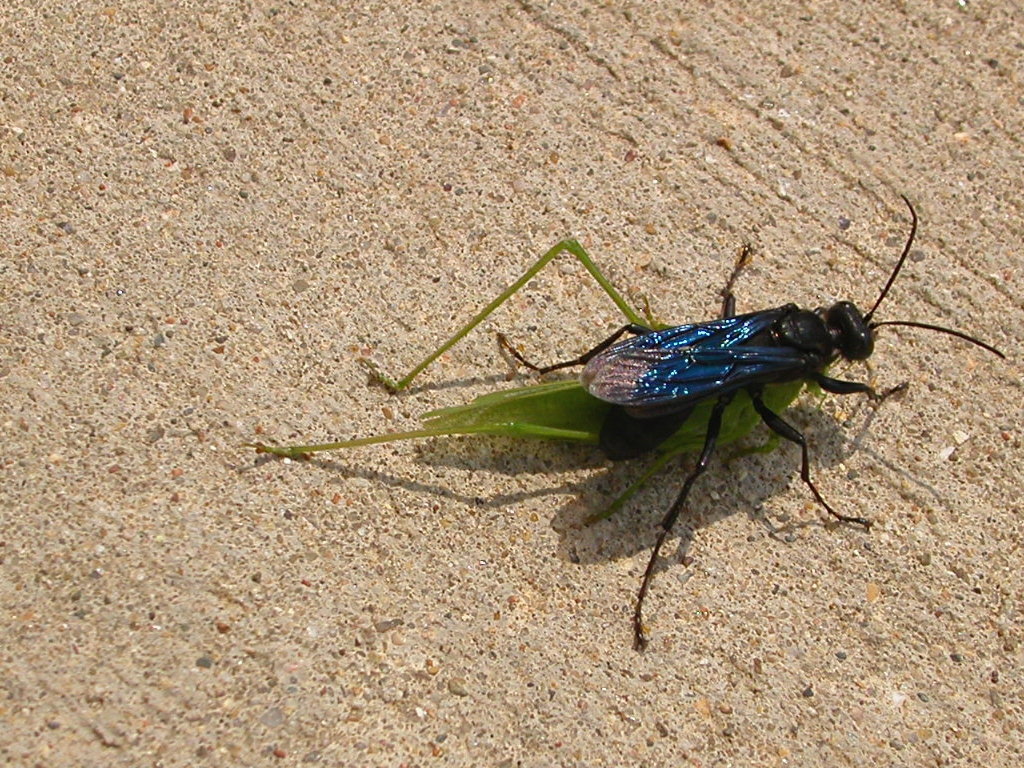
- Sphex pensylvanicus on a katydid

Scientific classification
- Kingdom: Animalia
- Phylum: Arthropoda
- Clade: Pancrustacea
- Class: Insecta
- Order: Hymenoptera
- Superfamily: Apoidea
- Family: Sphecidae
- Subfamily: Sphecinae
- Tribe: Sphecini
- Genus: Sphex; Linnaeus, 1758

Type species
- Sphex flavipennis Fabricius, 1793

Species
- More than 130; see text

= Sphex =

Genus of wasps

Sphex is a genus of cosmopolitan wasp that sting and paralyze prey insects. Sphex is one of many genera in the old digger wasp family Sphecidae (sensu lato), though most apart from the Sphecinae have now been moved to the family Crabronidae. There are over 130 known Sphex species.

== Behavior ==
In preparation for egg laying, they construct a protected "nest" (some species dig nests in the ground, while others use pre-existing holes) and then stock it with captured insects. Typically, the prey are left alive, but paralyzed by wasp toxins. The wasps lay their eggs in the provisioned nest and the wasp larvae feed on the paralyzed insects as they develop.

The great golden digger wasp (Sphex ichneumoneus) is found in North America. The developing wasps spend the winter in their nest. When the new generation of adults emerge, they contain the genetically programmed behaviors required to carry out another season of nest building. During the summer, a female might build as many as six nests, each with several compartments for her eggs. The building and provisioning of the nests takes place in a stereotypical, step-by-step fashion.

=== The Sphex Wasp Experiment ===
Sphex has been shown, as in some Jean-Henri Fabre studies, not to count how many crickets it collects for its nest. Although the wasp instinctively searches for four crickets, it cannot take into account a lost cricket, whether the cricket has been lost to ants or flies or simply been misplaced. Sphex drags its cricket prey towards its burrow by the antennae; if the antennae of the cricket are cut off, the wasp would not think to continue to pull its prey by a leg.

The navigation abilities of Sphex were studied by the ethologist Niko Tinbergen. Richard Dawkins and Jane Brockmann later studied female rivalry over nesting holes in Sphex ichneumoneus.

== Use in philosophy ==
Some writers in the philosophy of mind, most notably Daniel Dennett, have cited the results of the Sphex Wasp Experiment for their arguments about human and animal free will.

Some Sphex wasps drop a paralyzed insect near the opening of the nest. Before taking provisions into the nest, the Sphex first inspects the nest, leaving the prey outside. During the inspection, an experimenter can move the prey a few inches away from the opening. When the Sphex emerges from the nest ready to drag in the prey, it finds the prey missing. The Sphex quickly locates the moved prey, but now its behavioral "program" has been reset. After dragging the prey back to the opening of the nest, once again the Sphex is compelled to inspect the nest, so the prey is again dropped and left outside during another stereotypical inspection of the nest. This iteration can be repeated several times without the Sphex changing its sequence; by some accounts, endlessly. Dennett's argument quotes an account of Sphex behavior from Dean Wooldridge's Machinery of the Brain (1963). Douglas Hofstadter and Daniel Dennett have used this mechanistic behavior as an example of how seemingly thoughtful behavior can actually be quite mindless, the opposite of free will (or, as Hofstadter described it, sphexishness).

Philosopher Fred Keijzer challenges this use of Sphex, citing experiments in which behavioral adaptations are observed after many iterations. Keijzer sees the persistence of the Sphex example in cognitive theory as an indication of its rhetorical usefulness, not its factual accuracy. Keijzer also noted that repeated inspection of a disturbed nest may very well be an adaptive behavior, thus diminishing the aptness of Hofstadter's metaphor.

== Species ==
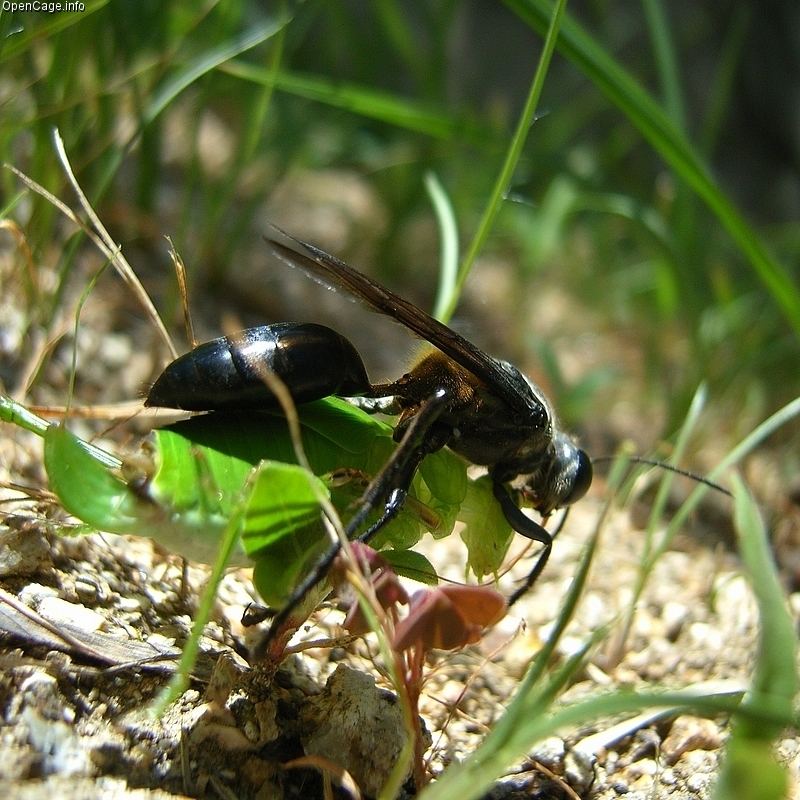
Sphex argentatus

Sphex funerarius with prey

Great golden digger wasp on narrow leaf milkweed. Part is shown at one tenth speed.

The genus Sphex contains 132 extant species:

- Sphex abyssinicus (Arnold, 1928)
- Sphex afer Lepeletier de Saint Fargeau, 1845
- Sphex ahasverus Kohl, 1890
- Sphex alacer Kohl, 1895
- Sphex antennatus F. Smith, 1856
- Sphex argentatissimus Dörfel and Ohl, 2015
- Sphex argentatus Fabricius, 1787
- Sphex argentinus Taschenberg, 1869
- Sphex ashmeadi (Fernald, 1906)
- Sphex atropilosus Kohl, 1885
- Sphex basilicus (R. Turner, 1915)
- Sphex bilobatus Kohl, 1895
- Sphex bohemanni Dahlbom, 1845
- Sphex brachystomus Kohl, 1890
- Sphex brasilianus Saussure, 1867
- Sphex brevipetiolatus Dörfel and Ohl, 2015
- Sphex caelebs Dörfel and Ohl, 2015
- Sphex caeruleanus Drury, 1773
- Sphex caliginosus Erichson, 1849
- Sphex camposi Campos, 1922
- Sphex carbonicolor Van der Vecht, 1973
- Sphex castaneipes Dahlbom, 1843
- Sphex cognatus F. Smith, 1856
- Sphex confrater Kohl, 1890
- Sphex corporosus Dörfel and Ohl, 2015
- Sphex cristi Genaro in Genaro & Juarrero, 2000
- Sphex cubensis (Fernald, 1906)
- Sphex darwinensis R. Turner, 1912
- Sphex decipiens Kohl, 1895
- Sphex decoratus F. Smith, 1873
- Sphex deplanatus Kohl, 1895
- Sphex diabolicus F. Smith, 1858
- Sphex dorsalis Lepeletier de Saint Fargeau, 1845
- Sphex dorycus Guérin-Méneville, 1838
- Sphex ephippium F. Smith, 1856
- Sphex ermineus Kohl, 1890
- Sphex erythrinus (Guiglia, 1939)
- Sphex ferrugineipes W. Fox, 1897
- Sphex finschii Kohl, 1890
- Sphex flammeus Dörfel and Ohl, 2015
- Sphex flavipennis Fabricius, 1793
- Sphex flavovestitus F. Smith, 1856
- Sphex formosellus Van der Vecht, 1957
- Sphex fortunatus Dörfel and Ohl, 2015
- Sphex fumicatus Christ, 1791
- Sphex fumipennis F. Smith, 1856
- Sphex funerarius Gussakovskij, 1934
- Sphex gaullei Berland, 1927
- Sphex gilberti R. Turner, 1908
- Sphex gracilis Dörfel and Ohl, 2015
- Sphex gisteli Strand, 1916
- Sphex guatemalensis Cameron, 1888
- Sphex habenus Say, 1832
- Sphex haemorrhoidalis Fabricius, 1781
- Sphex ichneumoneus (Linnaeus, 1758)
- Sphex imporcatus Dörfel and Ohl, 2015
- Sphex incomptus Gerstaecker, 1871
- Sphex ingens F. Smith, 1856
- Sphex inusitatus Yasumatsu, 1935
- Sphex jamaicensis (Drury, 1773)
- Sphex jansei Cameron, 1910
- Sphex jucundus Dörfel and Ohl, 2015
- Sphex kolthoffi Gussakovskij, 1938
- Sphex lanatus Mocsáry, 1883
- Sphex latilobus Dörfel and Ohl, 2015
- Sphex latreillei Lepeletier de Saint Fargeau, 1831
- Sphex latro Erichson, 1849
- Sphex leuconotus Brullé, 1833
- Sphex libycus Beaumont, 1956
- Sphex lucae Saussure, 1867
- Sphex luctuosus F. Smith, 1856
- Sphex madasummae Van der Vecht, 1973
- Sphex malagassus Saussure, 1890
- Sphex mandibularis Cresson, 1869
- Sphex maroccanus Schmid-Egger, 2019
- Sphex maximiliani Kohl, 1890
- Sphex melanocnemis Kohl, 1885
- Sphex melanopus Dahlbom, 1843
- Sphex melas Gussakovskij, 1930
- Sphex mendozanus Brèthes, 1909
- Sphex mimulus R. Turner, 1910
- Sphex mochii Giordani Soika, 1942
- Sphex modestus F. Smith, 1856
- Sphex muticus Kohl, 1885
- Sphex neavei (Arnold, 1928)
- Sphex neoumbrosus Jha & Farooqui, 1996
- Sphex nigrohirtus Kohl, 1895
- Sphex nitidiventris Spinola, 1851
- Sphex nudus Fernald, 1903
- Sphex observabilis (R. Turner, 1918)
- Sphex opacus Dahlbom, 1845
- Sphex optimus F. Smith, 1856
- Sphex oxianus Gussakovskij, 1928
- Sphex paulinierii Guérin-Méneville, 1843
- Sphex pensylvanicus Linnaeus, 1763
- Sphex permagnus (Willink, 1951)
- Sphex peruanus Kohl, 1890
- Sphex praedator F. Smith, 1858
- Sphex pretiosus Dörfel and Ohl, 2015
- Sphex prosper Kohl, 1890
- Sphex pruinosus Germar, 1817
- Sphex resinipes (Fernald, 1906)
- Sphex resplendens Kohl, 1885
- Sphex rex Hensen, 1991
- Sphex rhodosoma (R. Turner, 1915)
- Sphex rufinervis Pérez, 1985
- Sphex rufiscutis (R. Turner, 1918)
- Sphex rugifer Kohl, 1890
- Sphex satanas Kohl, 1898
- Sphex schlaeflei Schmid-Egger, 2019
- Sphex schoutedeni Kohl, 1913
- Sphex schrottkyi (Bertoni, 1918)
- Sphex semifossulatus Van der Vecht, 1973
- Sphex sericeus (Fabricius, 1804)
- Sphex servillei Lepeletier de Saint Fargeau, 1845
- Sphex solomon Hensen, 1991
- Sphex stadelmanni Kohl, 1895
- Sphex staudingeri Gribodo, 1894
- Sphex subhyalinus W. Fox, 1899
- Sphex subtruncatus Dahlbom, 1843
- Sphex tanoi Tsuneki, 1974
- Sphex taschenbergi Magretti, 1884
- Sphex tepanecus Saussure, 1867
- Sphex texanus Cresson, 1873
- Sphex tinctipennis Cameron, 1888
- Sphex tomentosus Fabricius, 1787
- Sphex torridus F. Smith, 1873
- Sphex vestitus F. Smith, 1856
- Sphex walshae Hensen, 1991
- Sphex wilsoni Hensen, 1991
- Sphex zubaidiyacus Augul, 2013

=== Fossil Species ===
- †Sphex bischoffi Zeuner, 1931
- †Sphex giganteus Heer, 1867
- †Sphex obscurus Statz, 1936
