= Banner Marsh State Fish and Wildlife Area =

State park in Illinois, United States

Coordinates: 40.5385°N 89.8417°W

- IUCN category IV (habitat/species management area)
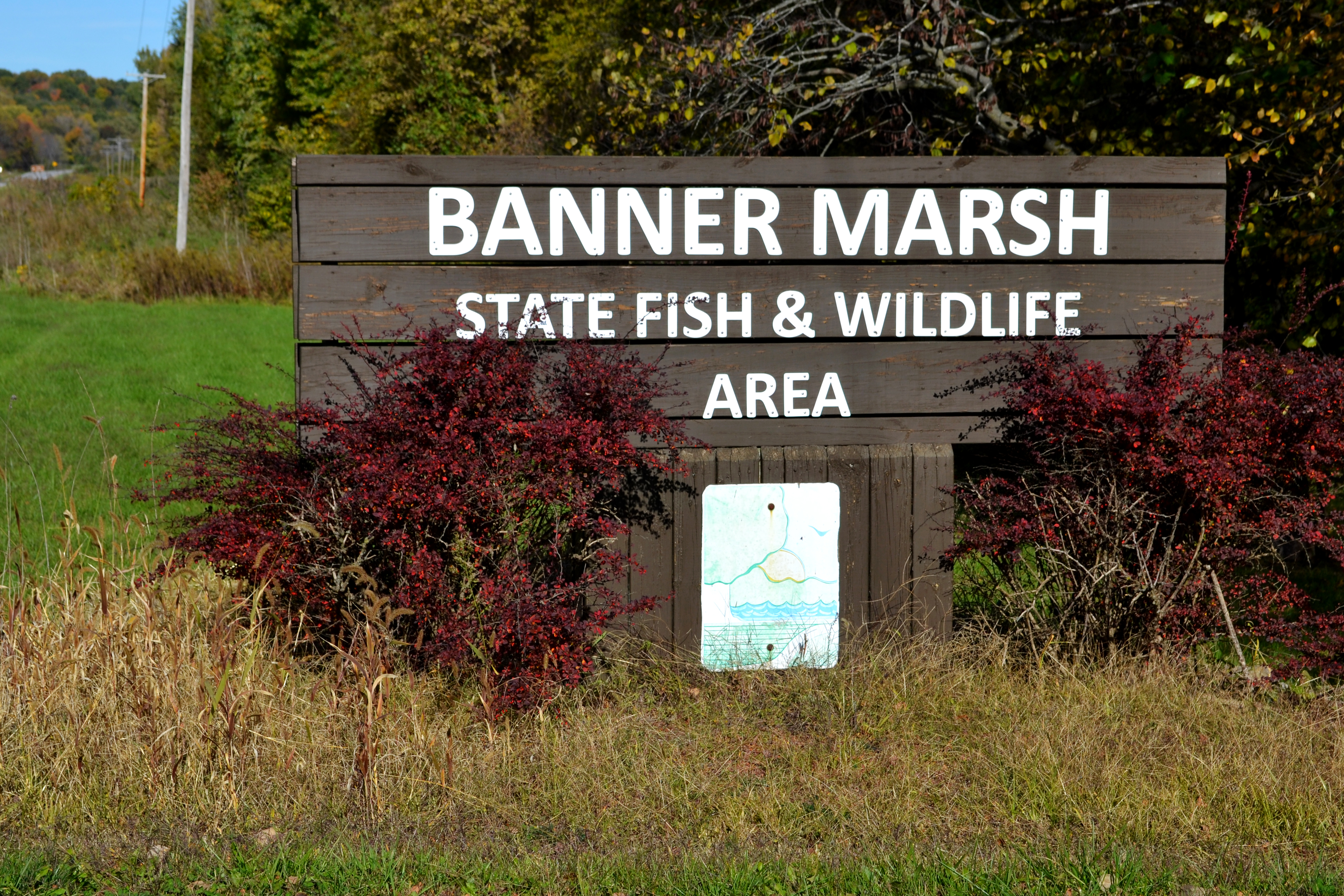
- Location: Fulton County, Illinois
- Nearest city: Canton, Illinois
- Area: 4,363 acres (1,766 ha)
- Governing body: Illinois Department of Natural Resources

Banner Marsh State Fish and Wildlife Area is an Illinois state park covering 4,363 acres (1,766 ha) in Fulton County, Illinois, United States.

== History ==
From 1910 to 1958, the former bottomland lake and marsh were leveed and drained for farming.

From the late 1880s to the mid-1980s, approximately 90% of the site was strip-mined for coal.

The Illinois Department of Natural Resources purchased the land in the 1980s. The Illinois Department of Natural Resources partnered with the U.S. Army Corps of Engineers on a reclamation project that was completed in May 2003. The project optimized the habitat for wildlife (fish and waterfowl), improved flood control, and increased food and cover for wildlife.

The three major lakes are Johnson (600 acres (240 ha)), Wheel (350 acres (140 ha)), and Shovel (100 acres (40 ha)). There are over 200 lakes at Banner Marsh.

== Flora and fauna ==
=== Flora ===
The park borders the Illinois River and contains over 200 water bodies that serve as a freshwater marsh habitat for wildlife. The land contains scattered deep-water lakes, floodplain forests, levees, shallow marshes, and extensive grasslands.

Some species of native flora include: American lotus and Swamp milkweed

=== Fauna ===
Banner Marsh State Fish and Wildlife Area is home to migrating and local waterfowl, fish, and other native wildlife.

Some of the native species include: waterfowl such as duck, goose, dove, quail, pheasant, rabbit, deer, and coyote.

==== Birds ====
Banner Marsh State Fish and Wildlife Area is an important stopover site for many migratory birds. The Audubon Society has chosen it as an Important Bird Area. Peoria Audubon Society has spotted over 200 species of birds. It also supports breeding populations for wetland and grassland birds. Some of the species of birds include: American bittern, American white pelican, bald eagle, Bell's vireo, black rail, black-crowned night heron, blue-winged teal, bobolink, double-crested cormorant, great egret, henslow's sparrow, hooded merganser, king rail, least bittern, mallard, northern harrier, orchard oriole, osprey, pied-billed grebe, rough-legged hawk, sedge wren, shorebirds, short-eared owl, terns, and Virginia rail.

==== Butterflies ====
Native plants provide a habitat for butterflies like Monarch Butterfly, Spangled Fritillary butterflies, and viceroys.

==== Fish ====
Some of the species of fish include: largemouth bass, smallmouth bass, northern pike, walleye, crappie, bluegill, redear, green sunfish, and channel catfish.
