= Jack Hailman =

American zoologist and ethologist

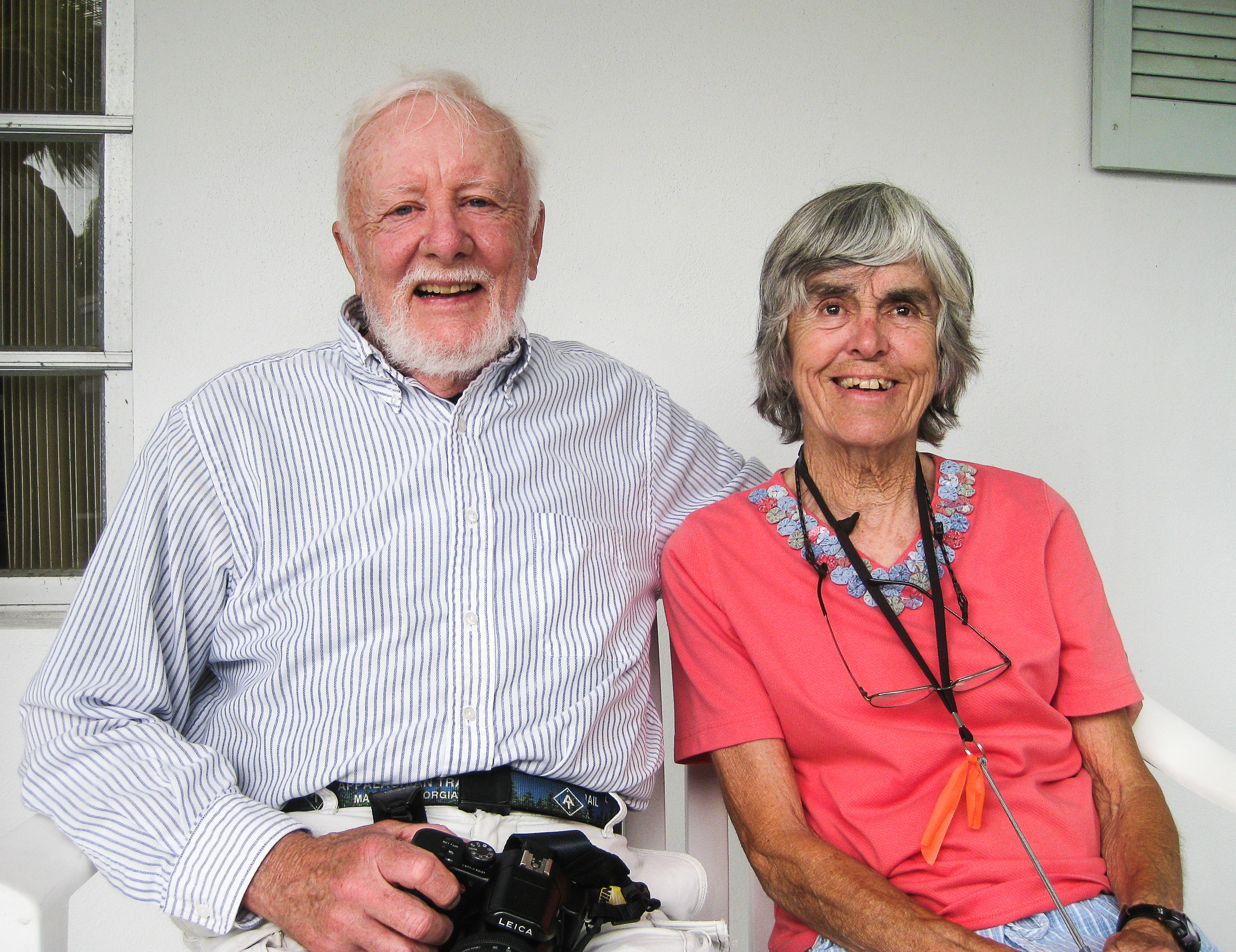
- Born: Jack Parker Hailman; May 6, 1936; St. Louis, Missouri
- Died: January 20, 2016 (aged 79); Jupiter Inlet Colony, Florida
- Education: Harvard College; Duke University
- Spouse: Liz Hailman
- Children: 2
- Awards: Animal Behavior Society Distinguished Animal Behaviorist Award (1998); Bureau of Land Management National Volunteer Award (2014)
- Scientific career
- Fields: Ethology; Zoology
- Institutions: University of Maryland; University of Wisconsin–Madison
- Thesis: The ontogeny of an instinct: The pecking response in chicks of the laughing gull (Larus atricilla L.) and related species (1964)
- Doctoral advisor: Peter H. Klopfer
- Doctoral students: H. Jane Brockmann

Jack Parker Hailman (May 6, 1936 – January 20, 2016) was an American zoologist and ethologist. He taught at the University of Wisconsin–Madison from 1969 to 1998, where he chaired the Department of Zoology from 1989 to 1991. He was executive editor of Animal Behaviour from 1972 to 1978 and served as president of the Animal Behavior Society from 1981 to 1982. In 1998, he received the Animal Behavior Society's Distinguished Animal Behaviorist Award, and in 2014, he received the Bureau of Land Management's National Volunteer Award. He was a fellow of the American Ornithologists' Union, the American Association for the Advancement of Science, the American Society of Naturalists, and the Animal Behavior Society.
