= Sphex tepanecus =

Scientific classification
- Kingdom: Animalia
- Phylum: Arthropoda
- Class: Insecta
- Order: Hymenoptera
- Family: Sphecidae
- Tribe: Sphecini
- Genus: Sphex
- Species: S. tepanecus

Binomial name
- Sphex tepanecus de Saussure, 1867

Synonyms
- Sphex mexicanus Taschenberg, 1869

Species of wasp

Sphex tepanecus is a species of thread-waisted wasp in the family Sphecidae.
