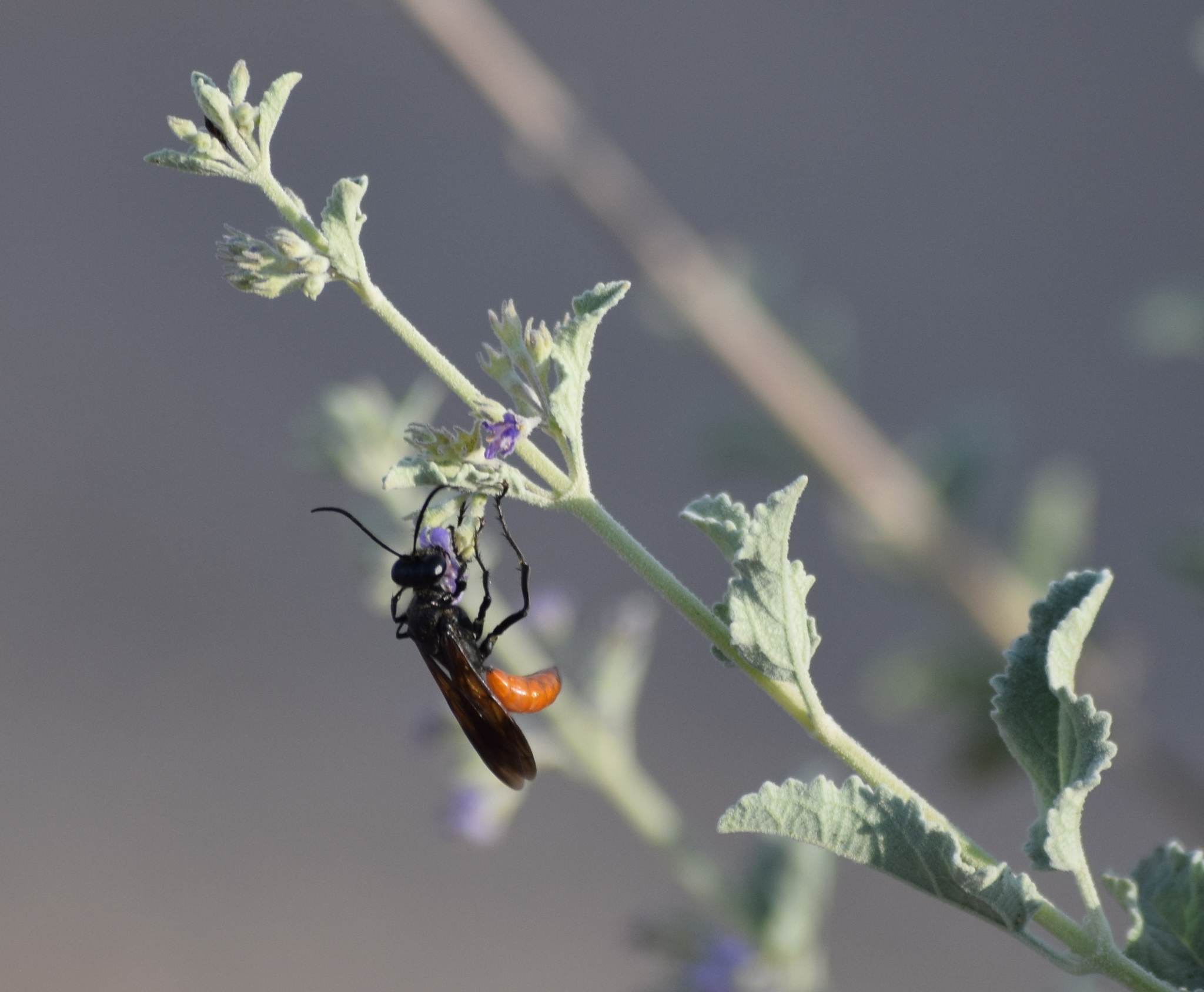

Scientific classification
- Kingdom: Animalia
- Phylum: Arthropoda
- Class: Insecta
- Order: Hymenoptera
- Family: Sphecidae
- Tribe: Sphecini
- Genus: Sphex
- Species: S. lucae

Binomial name
- Sphex lucae de Saussure, 1867

Synonyms
- Sphex belfragei Cresson, 1873; Fernaldina lucae Bohart & Menke, 1963

= Sphex lucae =

Species of wasp

Sphex lucae is a species of thread-waisted wasp in the family Sphecidae. Sphex lucae is predominantly found in western North America, but specimens have also been collected in Georgia and Florida.Entomologist Henry T. Fernald described this wasp as: "Body rather slender; the head and thorax black; the abdomen black to red, the two colors variously mingled in different examples, the males being generally much darker than the females; wings varying from yellowish hyaline with a fuliginous tinge to deep fuliginous with a violet reflection; legs dark ferruginous to black." Richard M. Bohart and Arnold S. Menke proposed moving this wasp to the monotypic genus Fernaldina. The main body of research on this wasp prior to 1965 regarded its propensity for communal roosting on plants.
