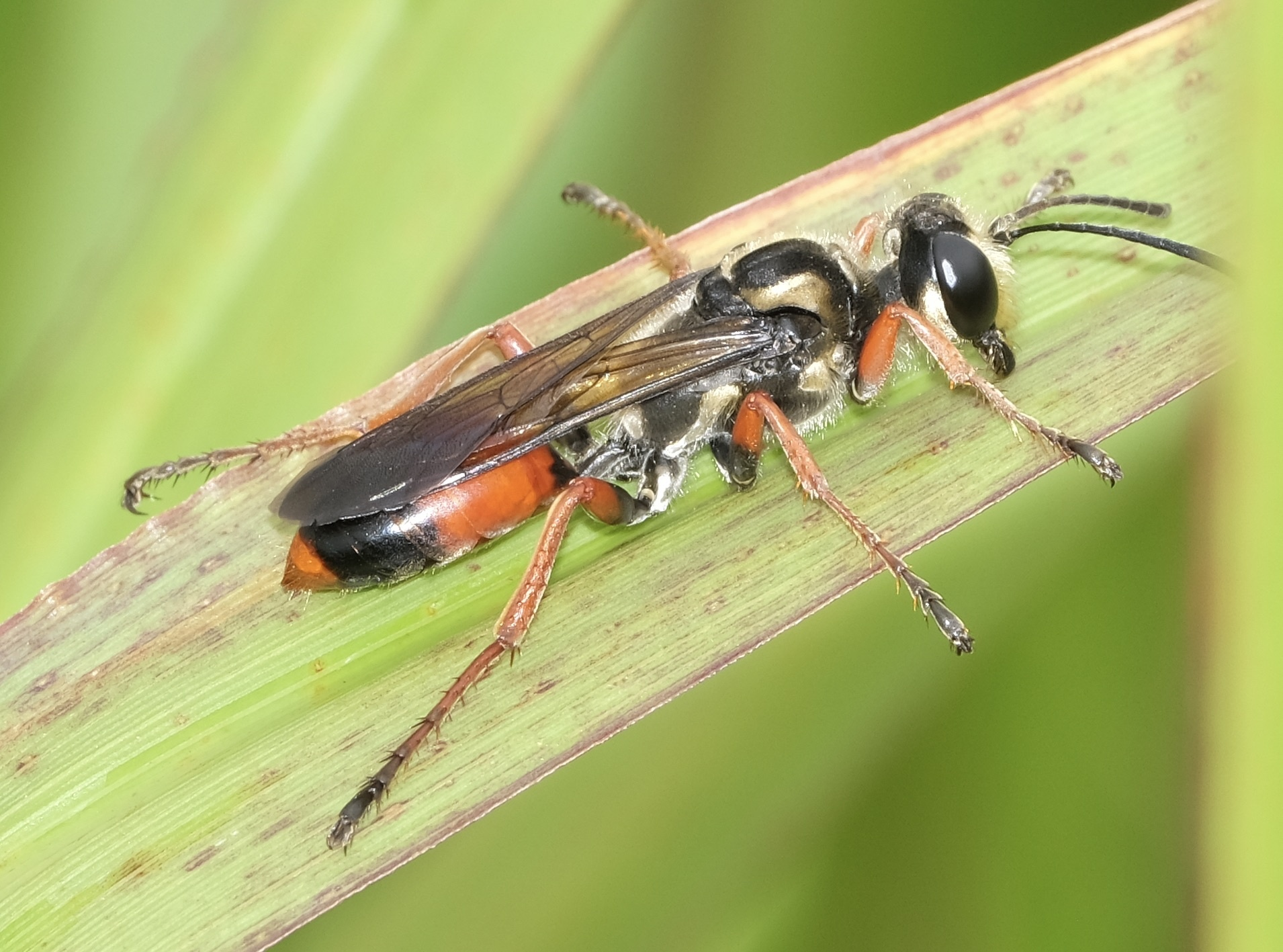

Scientific classification
- Kingdom: Animalia
- Phylum: Arthropoda
- Class: Insecta
- Order: Hymenoptera
- Family: Sphecidae
- Genus: Sphex
- Species: S. dorsalis

Binomial name
- Sphex dorsalis Lepeletier de Saint Fargeau, 1845

Synonyms
- Sphex chlorargyricus A. Costa, 1862; Sphex dubitatus Cresson, 1873; Sphex micans Taschenberg, 1869; Sphex singularis F. Smith, 1856; Sphex spiniger Kohl, 1890

= Sphex dorsalis =

Species of wasp

Sphex dorsalis is a species of thread-waisted wasp in the family Sphecidae. It is found from the southern United States south to Mexico, Central America, and South America.

Both the male and female Sphex dorsalis average around 19 millimetres (0.75 in) in length.
