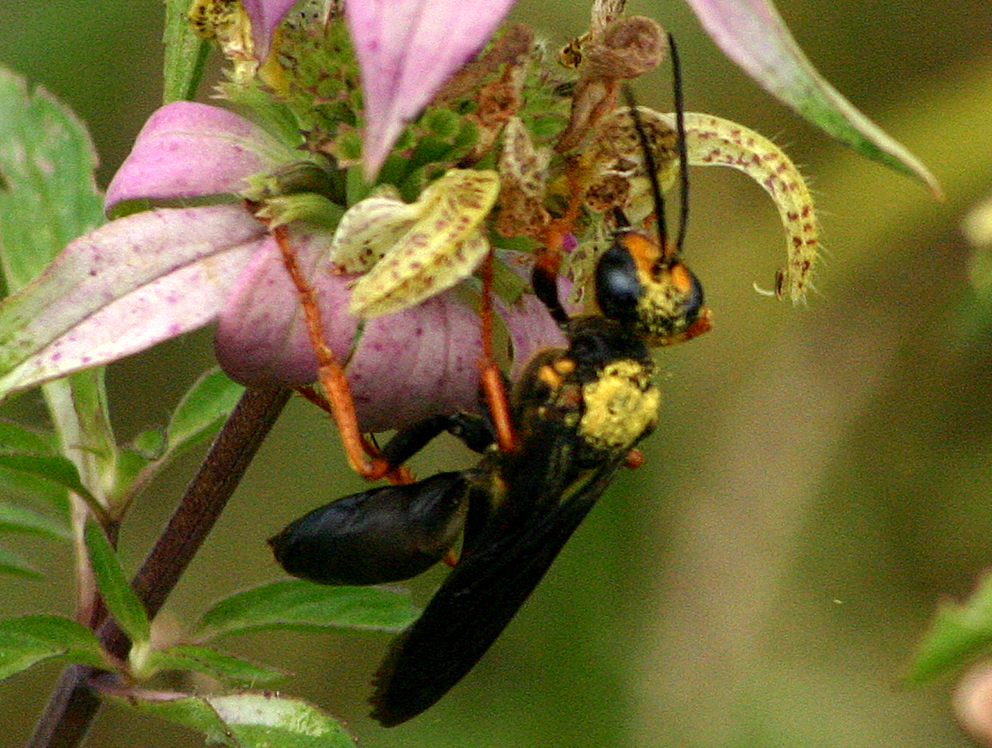
- S. flavovestitus pollinating Monarda

Scientific classification
- Kingdom: Animalia
- Phylum: Arthropoda
- Class: Insecta
- Order: Hymenoptera
- Family: Sphecidae
- Tribe: Sphecini
- Genus: Sphex
- Species: S. flavovestitus

Binomial name
- Sphex flavovestitus F. Smith, 1856

= Sphex flavovestitus =

Species of wasp

Sphex flavovestitus is a species of thread-waisted wasp in the family Sphecidae.

== Subspecies ==
These two subspecies belong to the species Sphex flavovestitus:

- Sphex flavovestitus flavovestitus F. Smith, 1856
- Sphex flavovestitus saussurei (Fernald, 1906)
