= Sphex texanus =

Scientific classification
- Kingdom: Animalia
- Phylum: Arthropoda
- Clade: Pancrustacea
- Class: Insecta
- Order: Hymenoptera
- Family: Sphecidae
- Tribe: Sphecini
- Genus: Sphex
- Species: S. texanus

Binomial name
- Sphex texanus Cresson, 1873

Species of wasp

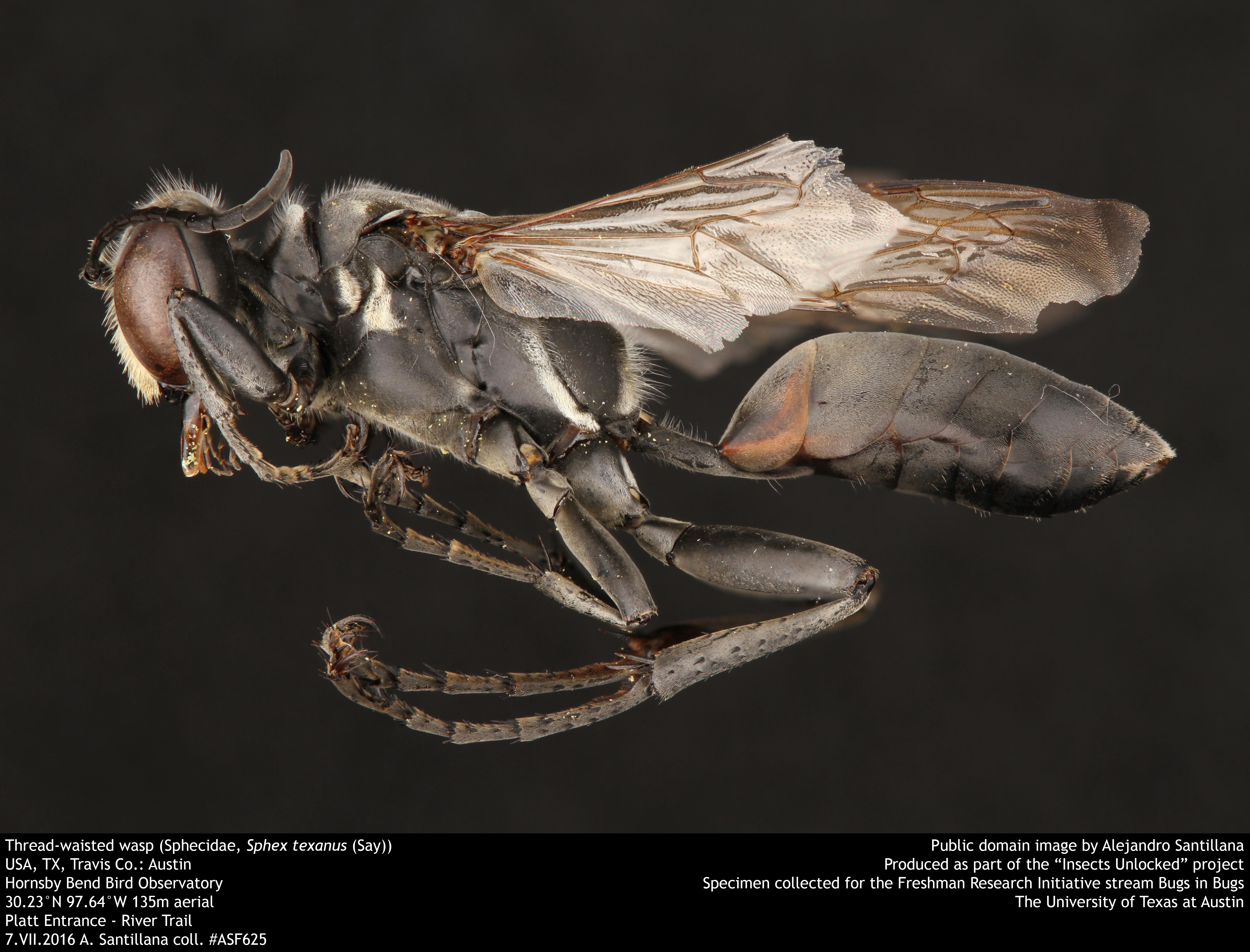
Image Of Thread-Waisted Wasp

Sphex texanus is a species of thread-waisted wasp in the family Sphecidae.
