= Sphex nudus =

Scientific classification
- Kingdom: Animalia
- Phylum: Arthropoda
- Class: Insecta
- Order: Hymenoptera
- Family: Sphecidae
- Genus: Sphex
- Species: S. nudus

Binomial name
- Sphex nudus Fernald, 1903

Synonyms
- Sphex bridwelli Fernald, 1903; Chlorion nudum (Fernald, 1903); Ammobia bridwelli (Fernald, 1903); Chlorion bridwelli (Fernald, 1903)

Species of wasp

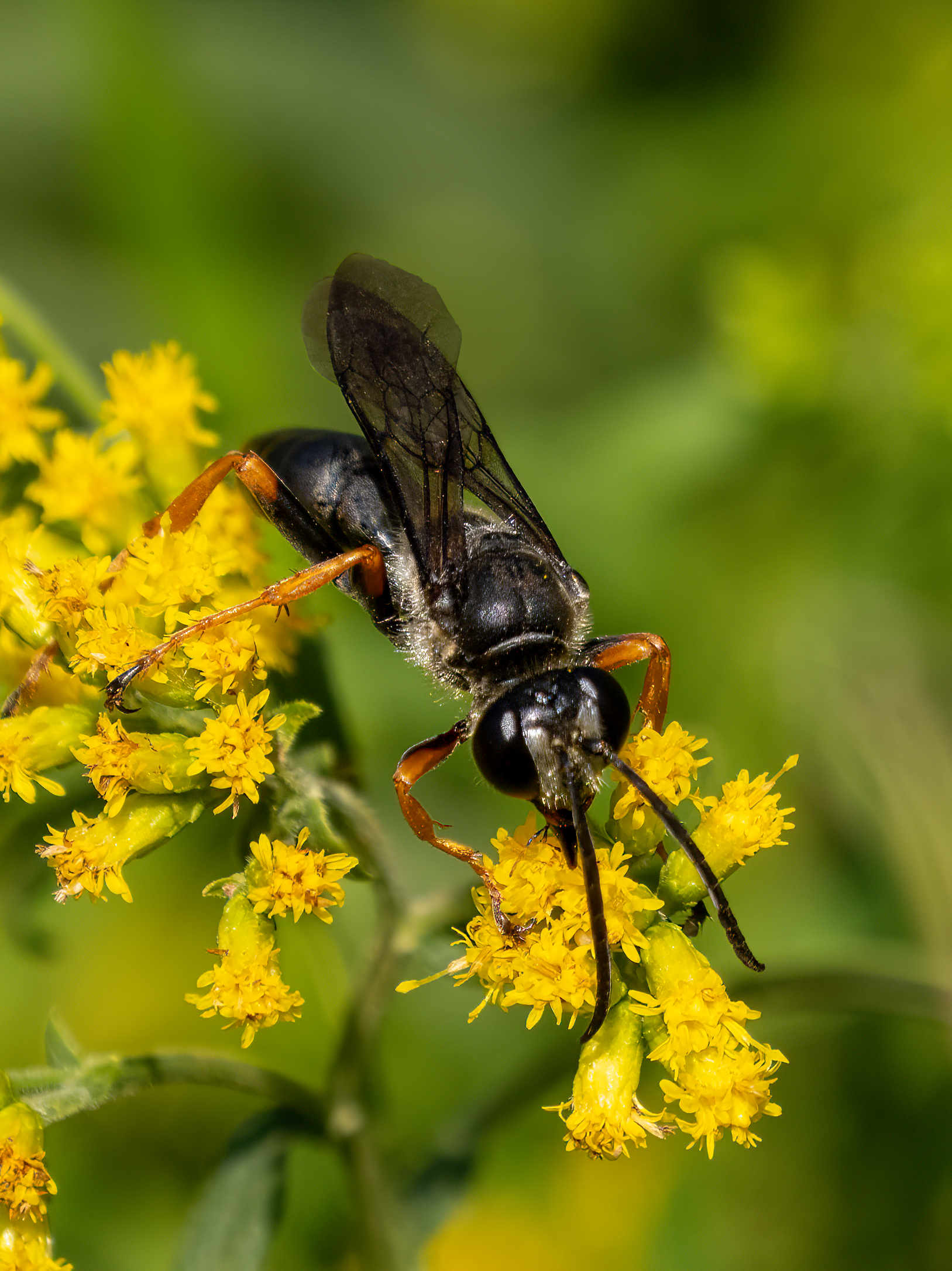
S. nudus in New York

Sphex nudus is a species of thread-waisted wasp in the family Sphecidae.

== Distribution ==
S. nudus occurs across the eastern United States

== Behavior ==
S. nudus primarily hunts Camptonotus carolinensis, a species of leaf-rolling cricket.
