= H. Jane Brockmann =

Animal behaviorist

Helen Jane Brockmann
- Education: Tufts University (BS); University of Wisconsin–Madison (MS, PhD)
- Scientific career
- Workplaces: University of Florida
- Thesis: The control of nesting behavior in the great golden digger wasp, Sphex ichneumoneus (L.) (Hymenoptera, Sphecidae) (1976)
- Doctoral advisor: Jack Hailman

H. Jane Brockmann is an emeritus professor at the University of Florida known for her research on animal behavior, especially in the mating and nesting behavior of horseshoe crabs. In 2008, she was elected a fellow of the American Association for the Advancement of Science.

== Early Education and career ==
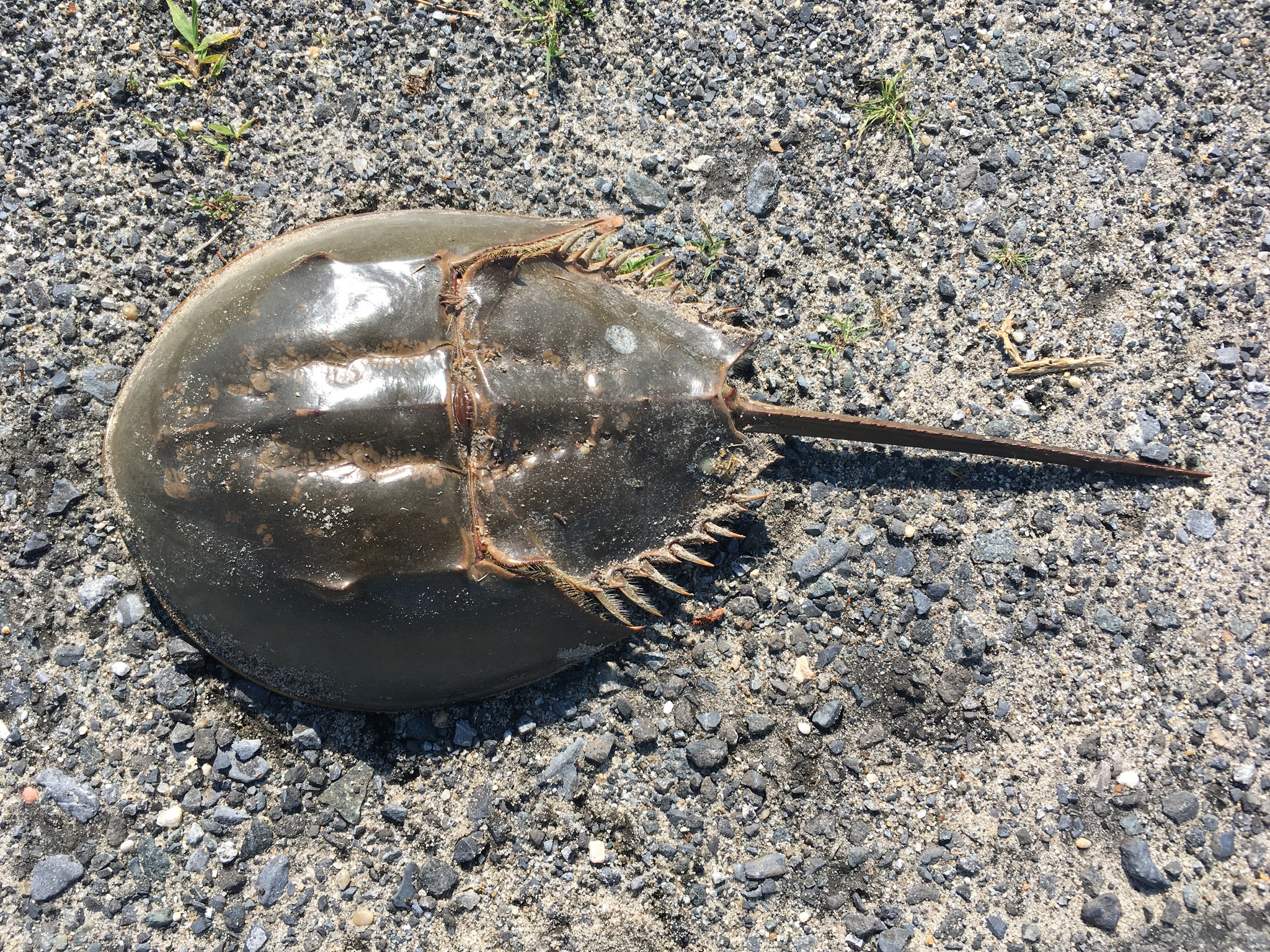
Brockmann's research includes investigations into the mating and nesting behavior of horseshoe crabs

Brockmann has a B.S. from Tufts University (1967) and an M.S. from the University of Wisconsin–Madison (1972). She earned her Ph.D. from the University of Wisconsin in 1976, and then took a position at the University of Florida as an assistant professor. In 1989, Brockmann was promoted to professor. In 2011, she became the first faculty Emerita of the biology department at the University of Florida, and there was a symposium given in her honor.

== Research ==
Brockmann's research on animal behavior spans different groups in the animal kingdom. She has examined kleptoparasitism in birds, the mating and nesting tactics of wasps including investigations into the mud-daubing wasp Trypoxylon politum and a digger wasp (Sphex ichneumoneus). In beetles, she has examined sexual selection in Diaprepes abbreviatus which is important in Florida because it causes problems with citrus crops. Her research on behavior and population biology of horseshoe crabs is conducted at Cedar Keys National Wildlife Refuge, and includes addressing the question of why females select their nesting sites and the nesting tactics of males. She has also used genetics to define genetically distinct groups of horseshoe crabs in Florida and along the east coast of the United States.

=== Selected publications ===
- Brockmann, H. Jane; Barnard, C. J. (1979-05-01). "Kleptoparasitism in birds". Animal Behaviour. 27: 487–514. doi:10.1016/0003-3472(79)90185-4. ISSN 0003-3472. S2CID 53151684.
- Brockmann, H. Jane (1990-01-01). "Mating Behavior of Horseshoe Crabs, Limulus Polyphemus". Behaviour. 114 (1–4): 206–220. doi:10.1163/156853990X00121. ISSN 0005-7959.
- Brockmann, H. Jane (2001-01-01), The evolution of alternative strategies and tactics, Advances in the Study of Behavior, vol. 30, Academic Press, pp. 1–51, doi:10.1016/s0065-3454(01)80004-8, ISBN 9780120045303

== Awards and honors ==
- Penny Bernstein Distinguished Teaching Award, inaugural recipient, Animal Behavior Society (1995)
- Elected fellow, Animal Behavior Society (1995)
- Distinguished Service Award, Animal Behavior Society (2000)
- Fellow, American Association for the Advancement of Science (2008)
- Myrle E. and Verle D. Nietzel Visiting Distinguished Faculty Program Award, University of Kentucky (2011)
- Distinguished Animal Behaviorist Award, Animal Behavior Society (2016)
- Fellow, American Academy of Arts and Sciences (2025)
