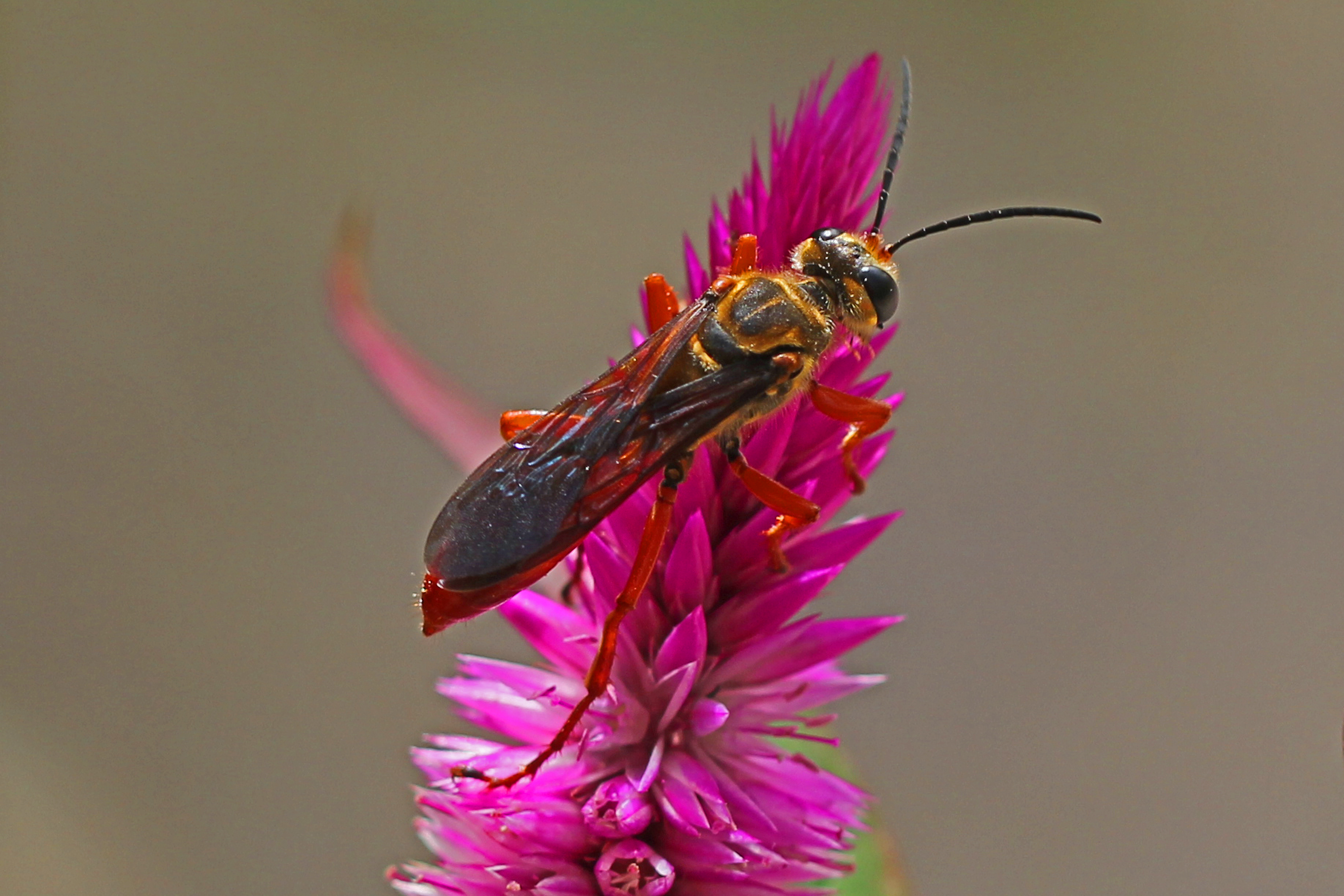

Scientific classification
- Kingdom: Animalia
- Phylum: Arthropoda
- Class: Insecta
- Order: Hymenoptera
- Family: Sphecidae
- Genus: Sphex
- Species: S. jamaicensis

Binomial name
- Sphex jamaicensis (Drury, 1773)

Synonyms
- Sphex aurulentus Guérin-Méneville, 1835; Sphex ichneumoneus fulviventris Guérin-Méneville, 1844; Sphex lanierii Lepeletier de Saint Fargeau, 1845; Sphex ornatus Drury, 1773; Vespa jamaicensis Kohl, 1890

= Sphex jamaicensis =

Species of wasp

Sphex jamaicensis is a species of thread-waisted wasp in the family Sphecidae. It is found in Florida, Cuba (including Isla de la Juventud), the Bahamas, and Jamaica.

ITIS Taxonomic notes:

- "Sphex jamaicensis (Drury, 1773) (originally in Vespa) is apparently a senior secondary homonym of Sphex jamaicensis Fabricius, 1775 (though these two have apparently never been treated as congeneric)."
- "Sphex jamaicensis Fabricius, 1775 is apparently a junior secondary homonym of Sphex jamaicensis (Drury, 1773) (originally in Vespa) (though these two have apparently never been treated as congeneric)."

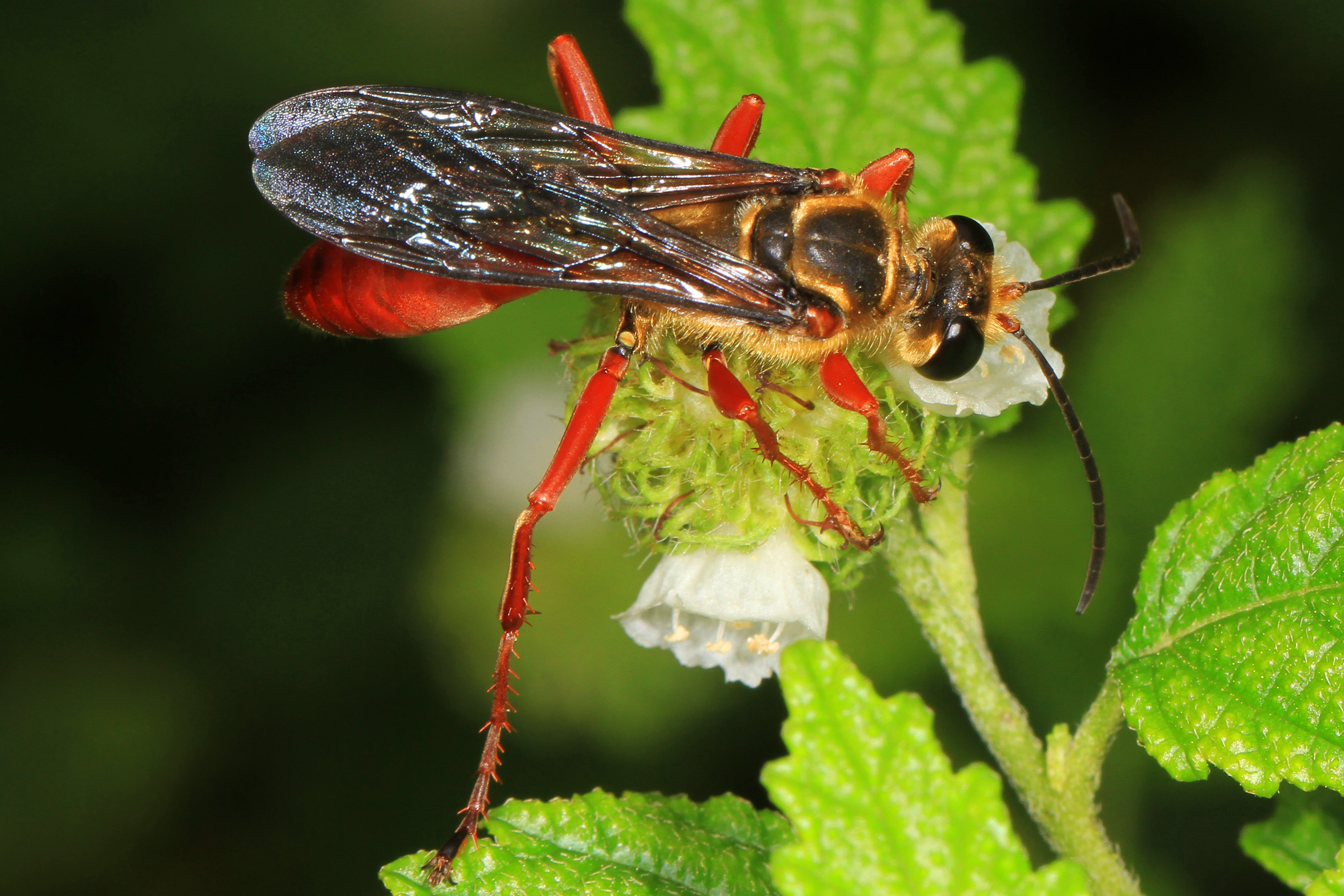
