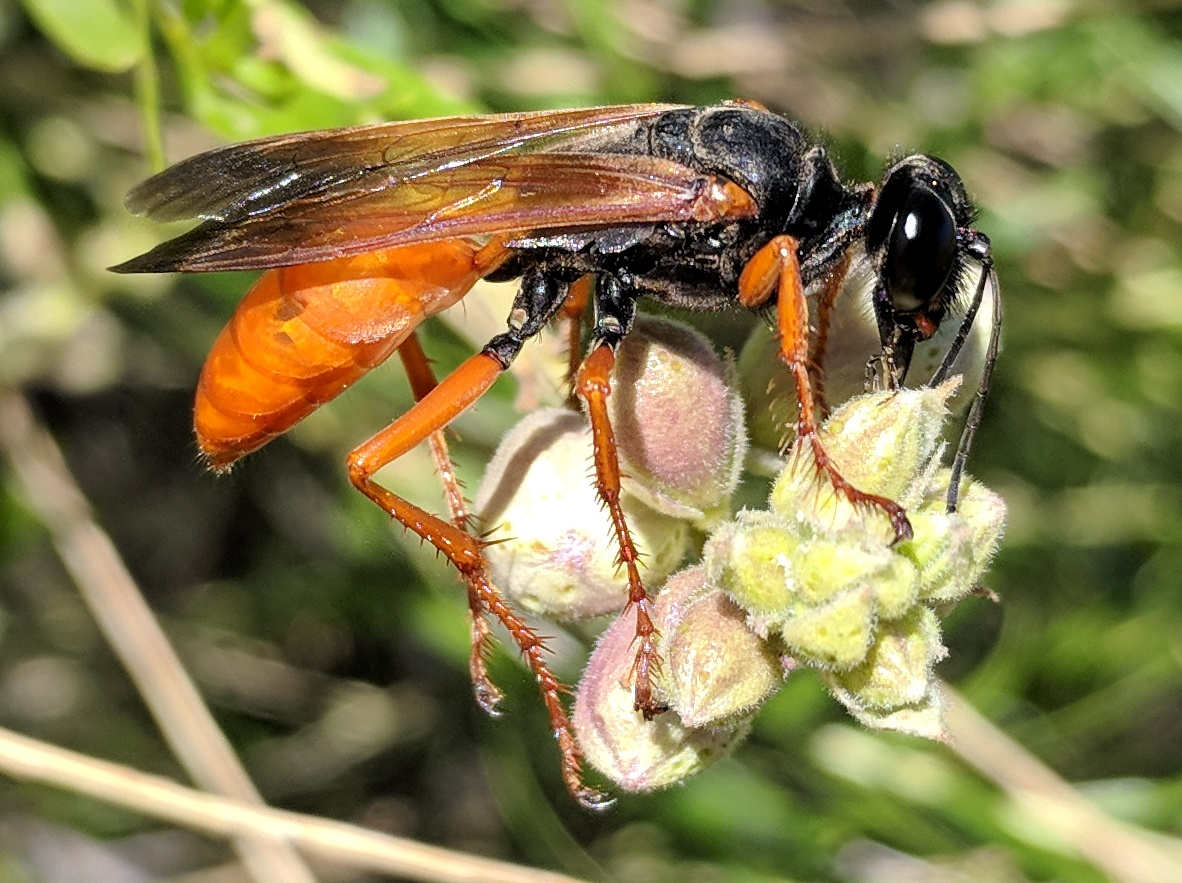

Scientific classification
- Kingdom: Animalia
- Phylum: Arthropoda
- Class: Insecta
- Order: Hymenoptera
- Family: Sphecidae
- Genus: Sphex
- Species: S. ashmeadi

Binomial name
- Sphex ashmeadi (Fernald, 1906)

Synonyms
- Chlorion ashmeadi Fernald, 1906

= Sphex ashmeadi =

Species of wasp

Sphex ashmeadi is a species of thread-waisted wasp in the family Sphecidae.
