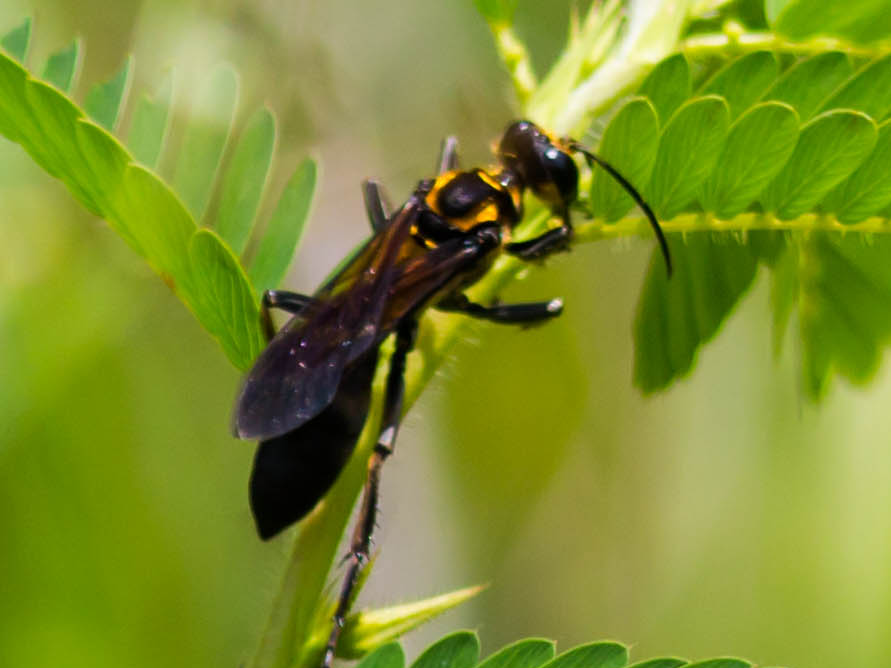
- S. habenus female
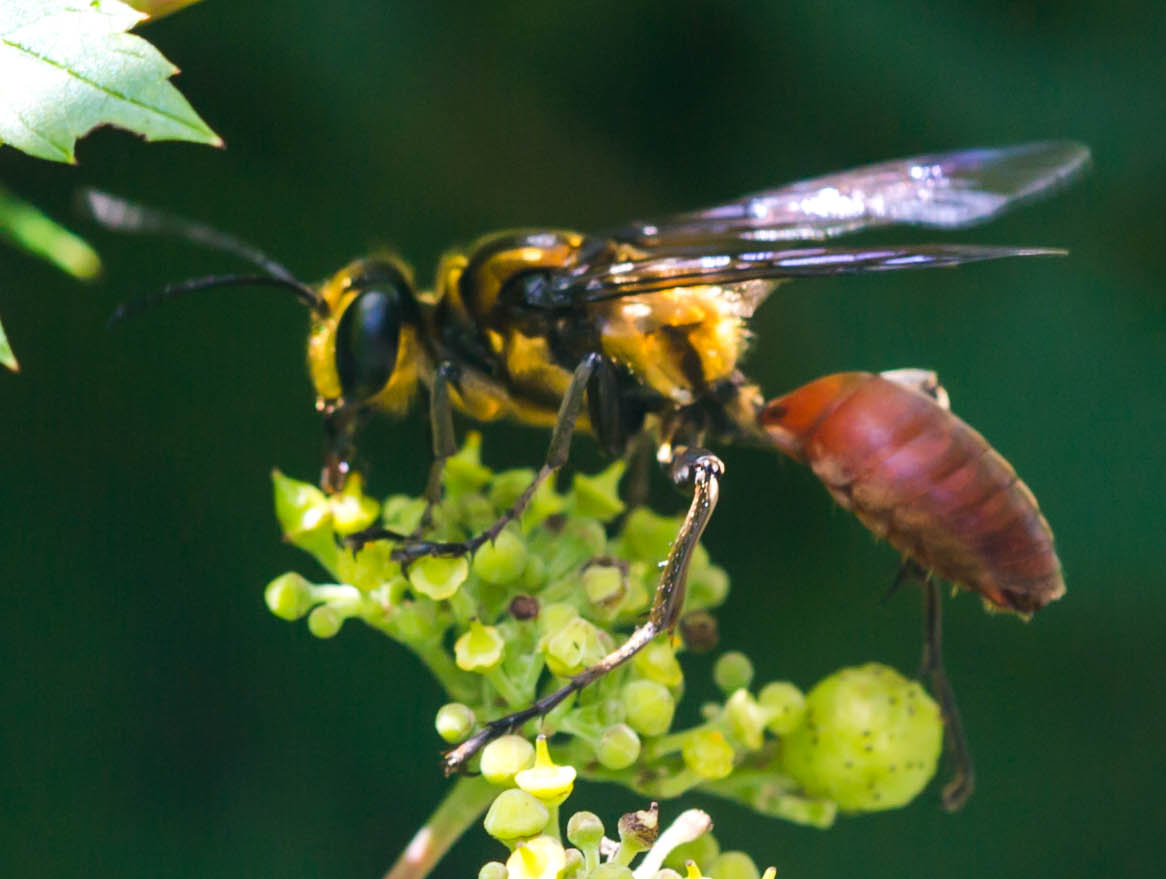
- S. habenus male

Scientific classification
- Kingdom: Animalia
- Phylum: Arthropoda
- Class: Insecta
- Order: Hymenoptera
- Family: Sphecidae
- Genus: Sphex
- Species: S. habenus

Binomial name
- Sphex habenus Say, 1832

Synonyms
- Sphex chrysophorus Kohl, 1890; Sphex lanciger Kohl, 1895; Sphex lautus Cresson, 1873; Sphex princeps Kohl, 1890

= Sphex habenus =

Species of wasp

Sphex habenus is a species of thread-waisted wasp in the family Sphecidae.
