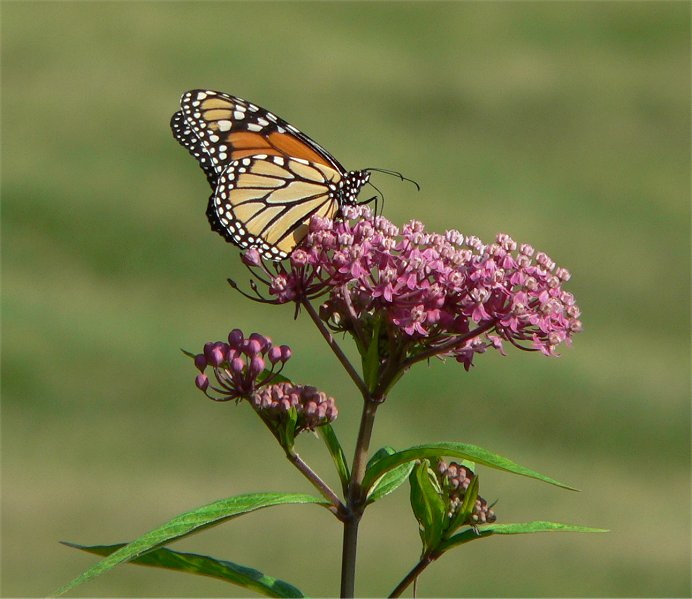

Conservation status
- Least Concern (IUCN 3.1)

Scientific classification
- Kingdom: Plantae
- Clade: Tracheophytes
- Clade: Angiosperms
- Clade: Eudicots
- Clade: Asterids
- Order: Gentianales
- Family: Apocynaceae
- Genus: Asclepias
- Species: A. incarnata

Binomial name
- Asclepias incarnata L.

Synonyms
- Acerates incarnata (L.) Decne.

= Asclepias incarnata =

Species of flowering plant

Asclepias incarnata, the swamp milkweed, rose milkweed, rose milkflower, swamp silkweed, or white Indian hemp, is a herbaceous perennial plant species native to North America. It grows in damp through wet soils and also is cultivated as a garden plant for its flowers, which attract butterflies and other pollinators with nectar. Like most other milkweeds, it has latex containing toxic steroids, a characteristic that repels many species of insects and mammals.

== Description ==
Swamp milkweed is an upright plant, 100 to 150 cm (40 to 60 in) tall, growing from thick, fleshy white roots. Typically, its stems are branched and the clump-forming plants emerge in late spring after most other plants have begun growth for the year. The oppositely arranged leaves are 7.5 to 15 cm (3 to 6 in) long and 1 to 4 cm (1/2 to 1 1/2 in) wide, narrow and lance-shaped, with the ends tapering to a sharp point.

The plants bloom in early through mid-summer, producing small, fragrant flowers, colored pink to mauve (sometimes white), in rounded umbellate racemes. The flower color varies from darker shades of purple through soft, pinkish purple, and a white flowering form exists as well. The actinomorphic flowers have five reflexed petals and an elevated central crown. After blooming, green follicles are produced, approximately 12 cm (4 3/4 in) long, which split open when ripe. They then release light or dark brown flat seeds, which are attached to silky silver-white hairs that catch the wind. This natural mechanism for seed dispersal is similar to that used by other milkweed species.

== Taxonomy ==
As of July 2021, Kew's Plants of the World Online (POWO) accepts 2 infraspecies, each having numerous synonyms:

- Asclepias incarnata subsp. incarnata
  - Synonym: Asclepias albiflora Raf.
  - Synonym: Asclepias amoena Brongn.
  - Synonym: Asclepias incarnata f. albiflora (Raf.) A.Heller
  - Synonym: Asclepias incarnata f. candida Fernald
  - Synonym: Asclepias incarnata var. glabra Eaton & Wright
  - Synonym: Asclepias incarnata f. rosea B.Boivin
  - Synonym: Asclepias maritima Raf. ex Decne.
  - Synonym: Asclepias verecunda Salisb.
- Asclepias incarnata subsp. pulchra (Ehrh. ex Willd.) Woodson
  - Synonym: Asclepias incarnata var. neoscotica Fernald
  - Synonym: Asclepias incarnata f. pulchra (Ehrh. ex Willd.) Voss
  - Synonym: Asclepias incarnata var. pulchra (Ehrh. ex Willd.) Pers.
  - Synonym: Asclepias pulchra Ehrh. ex Willd.
  - Synonym: Asclepias pulchra f. albiflora House

The flower stalks and abaxial leaf surfaces of subspecies pulchra are abundantly pubescent, whereas those of the autonymous subspecies are nearly glabrous.

== Habitat ==
Swamp milkweed prefers neutral to slightly acidic soil with rich, wet, very muddy to average garden moisture and full sun or partial shade. It is most often found on the margins of flooded plains, lakes, ponds, waterways, marshes, swamps, and other wet areas. It is one of the best attractors of the monarch butterfly (Danaus plexippus), which feeds on the flowers and lays eggs on the plants. The emerging caterpillars feed on the leaves.

The plants have specialized, thickened white roots which can function in heavy, wet soils that are low in oxygen. Blooming occurs in mid- through late summer. After blooming, long, relatively thin, rounded follicles are produced and grow upright. They split open in late summer through late fall, releasing seeds attached to silky hairs, which act as parachutes that carry the seeds in wind currents.

== Cultivation ==
A. incarnata is cultivated frequently, and a number of cultivars are available. They are used especially in gardens designed to attract butterflies (see Butterfly gardening). The nectar of the plant attracts many other species of insect as well. The plants are also sold as freshly cut flowers, mostly for their long-lasting flower display, but sometimes for the distinctive follicles.

Monarch Watch provides information on rearing monarchs and their host plants. Efforts to increase monarch butterfly populations by establishing butterfly gardens and monarch migratory "waystations" require particular attention to the target species' food preferences and population cycles, as well to the conditions needed to propagate and maintain their food plants.

The seeds of some milkweeds need periods of cold treatment (cold stratification) before they will germinate. To protect seeds from washing away during heavy rains and from seed-eating birds, one can cover the seeds with a light fabric or with an 0.5 in (13 mm) layer of straw mulch. However, mulch acts as an insulator. Thicker layers of mulch can prevent seeds from germinating if they prevent soil temperatures from rising enough when winter ends. Further, few seedlings can push through a thick layer of mulch.

Breeding monarchs prefer to lay eggs on A. incarnata. The species is therefore often planted in butterfly gardens and "Monarch Waystations" to help sustain monarch butterfly populations. However, A. incarnata is an early successional plant that usually grows at the margins of wetlands and in seasonally flooded areas.

The plant is slow to spread via seeds, does not spread by runners and tends to disappear as vegetative densities increase and habitats dry out. Although A. incarnata plants can survive for up to 20 years, most live only two-five years in gardens. The species is not shade-tolerant and is not a good vegetative competitor.

== Images ==
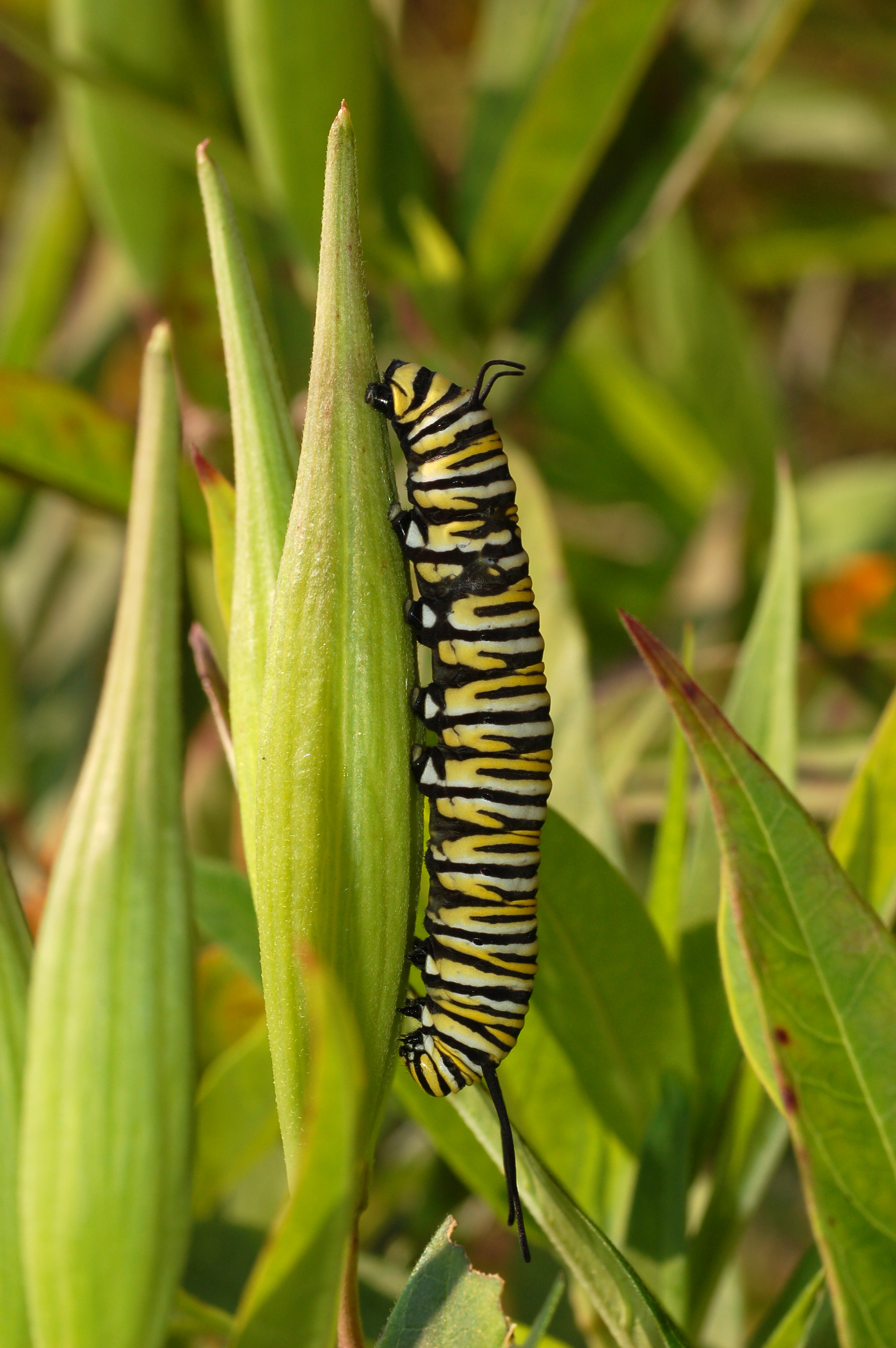
With monarch butterfly larva

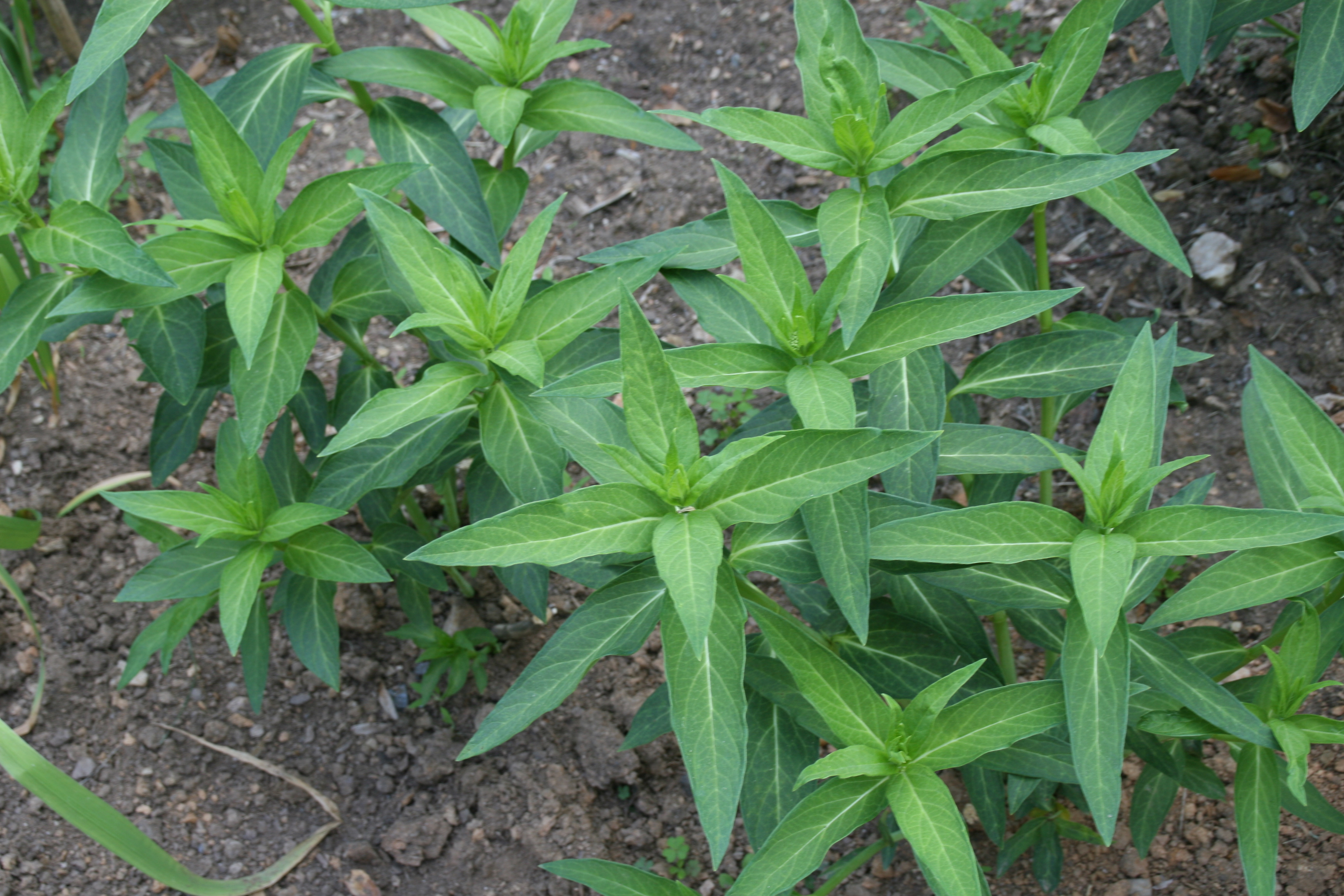
Asclepias incarnata foliage

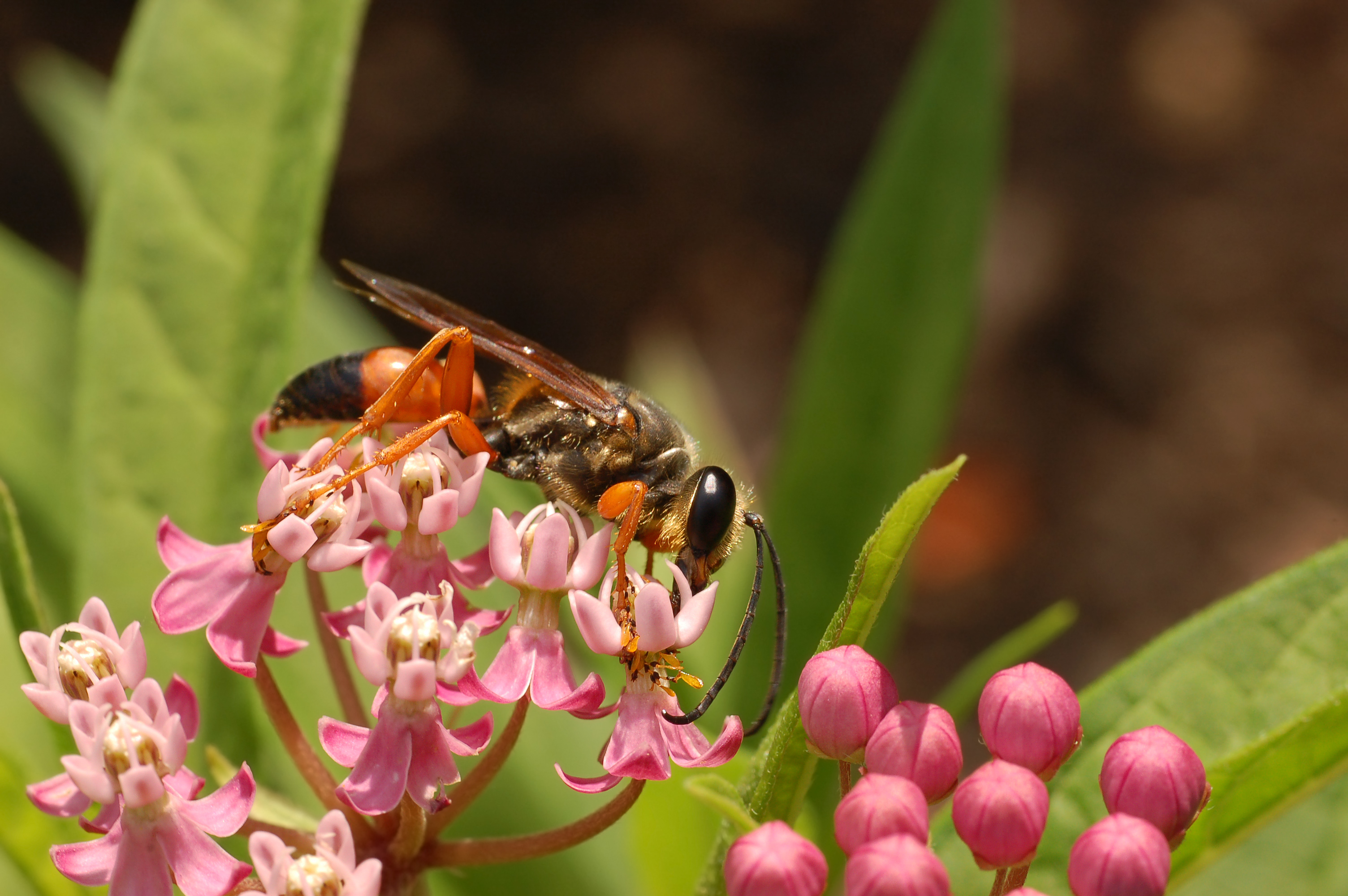
With Sphex ichneumoneus

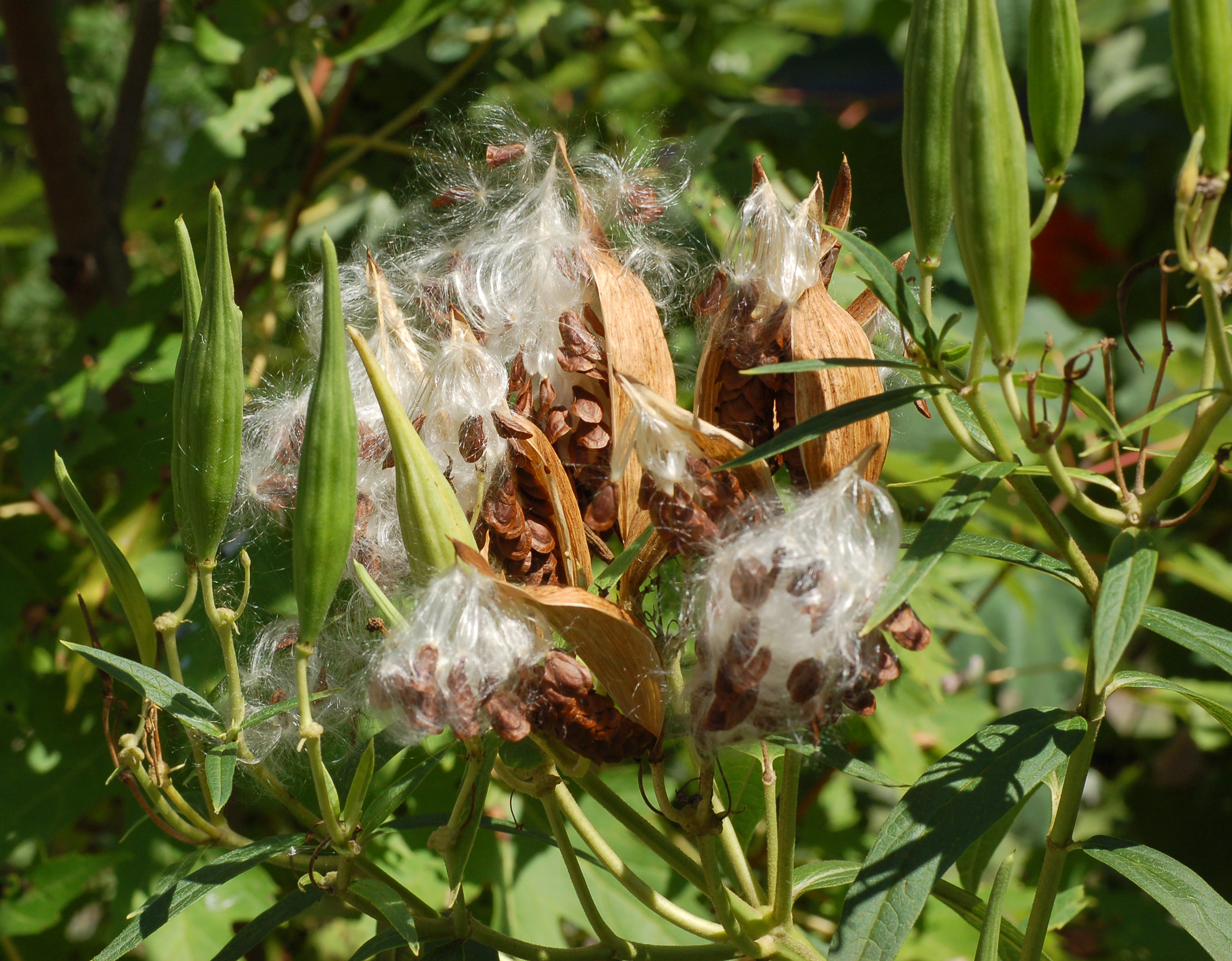
Open follicles

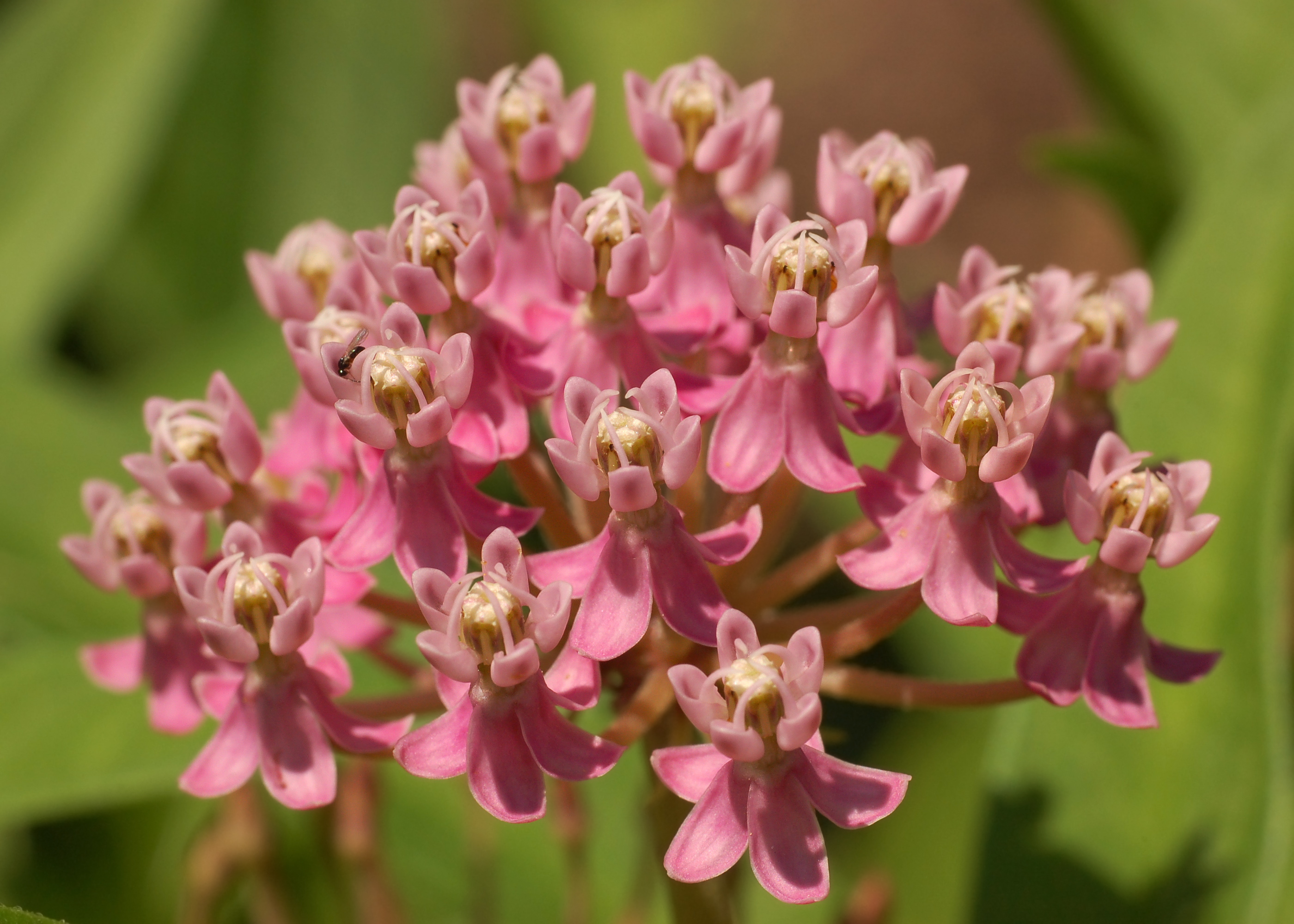
Inflorescence

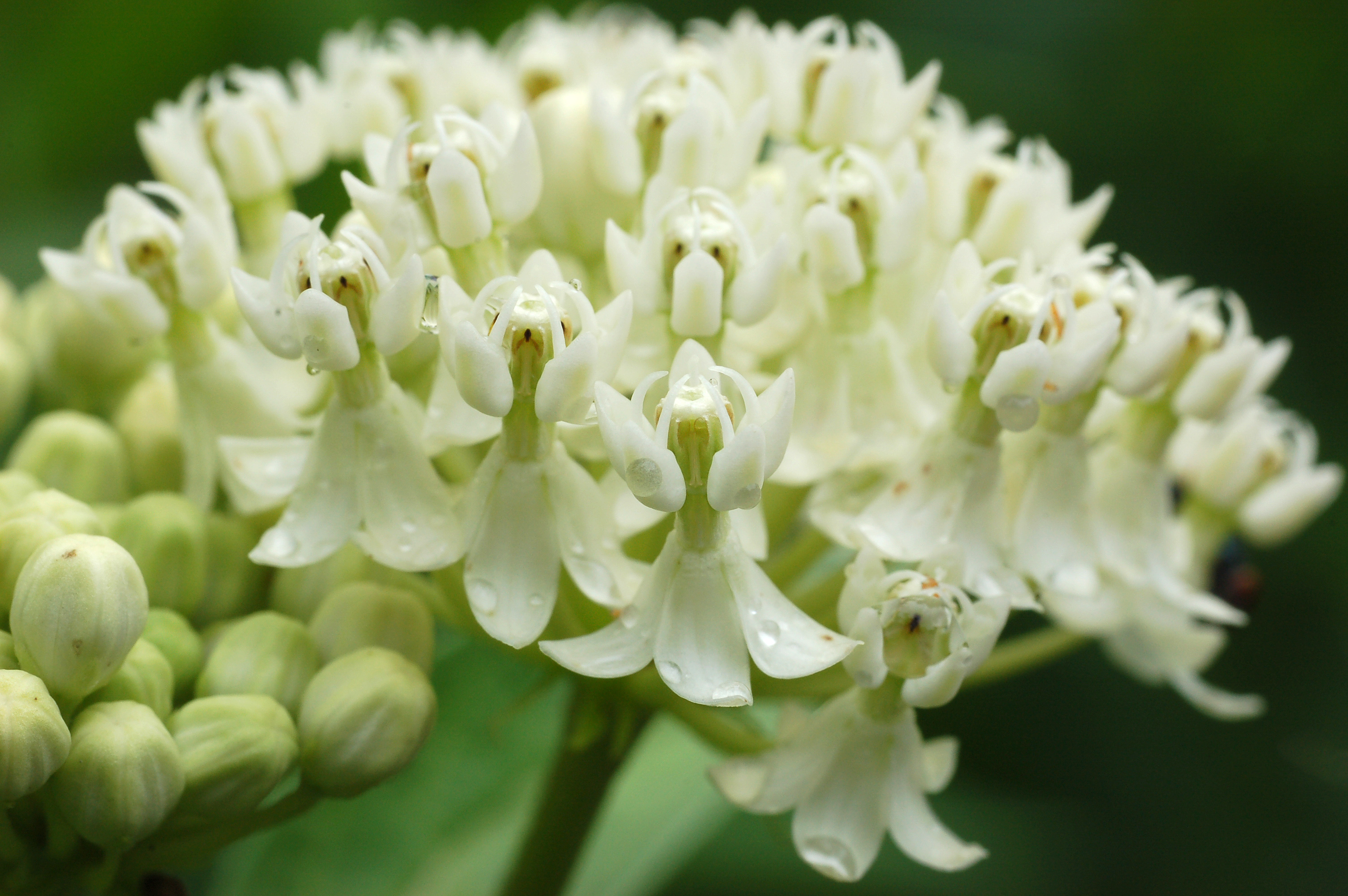
Asclepias incarnata 'Ice Ballet'

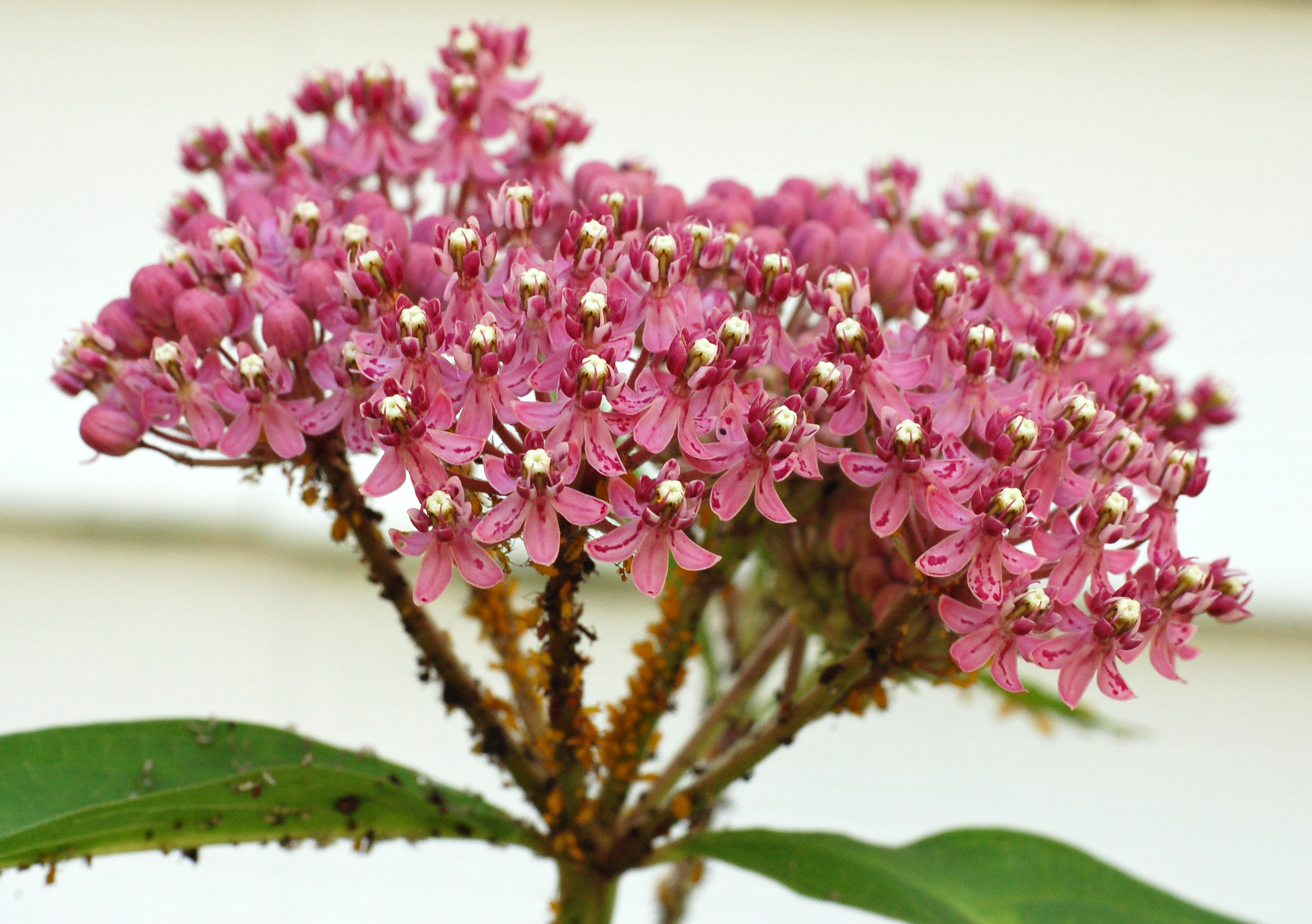
Spotted flower cultivar of Asclepias incarnata

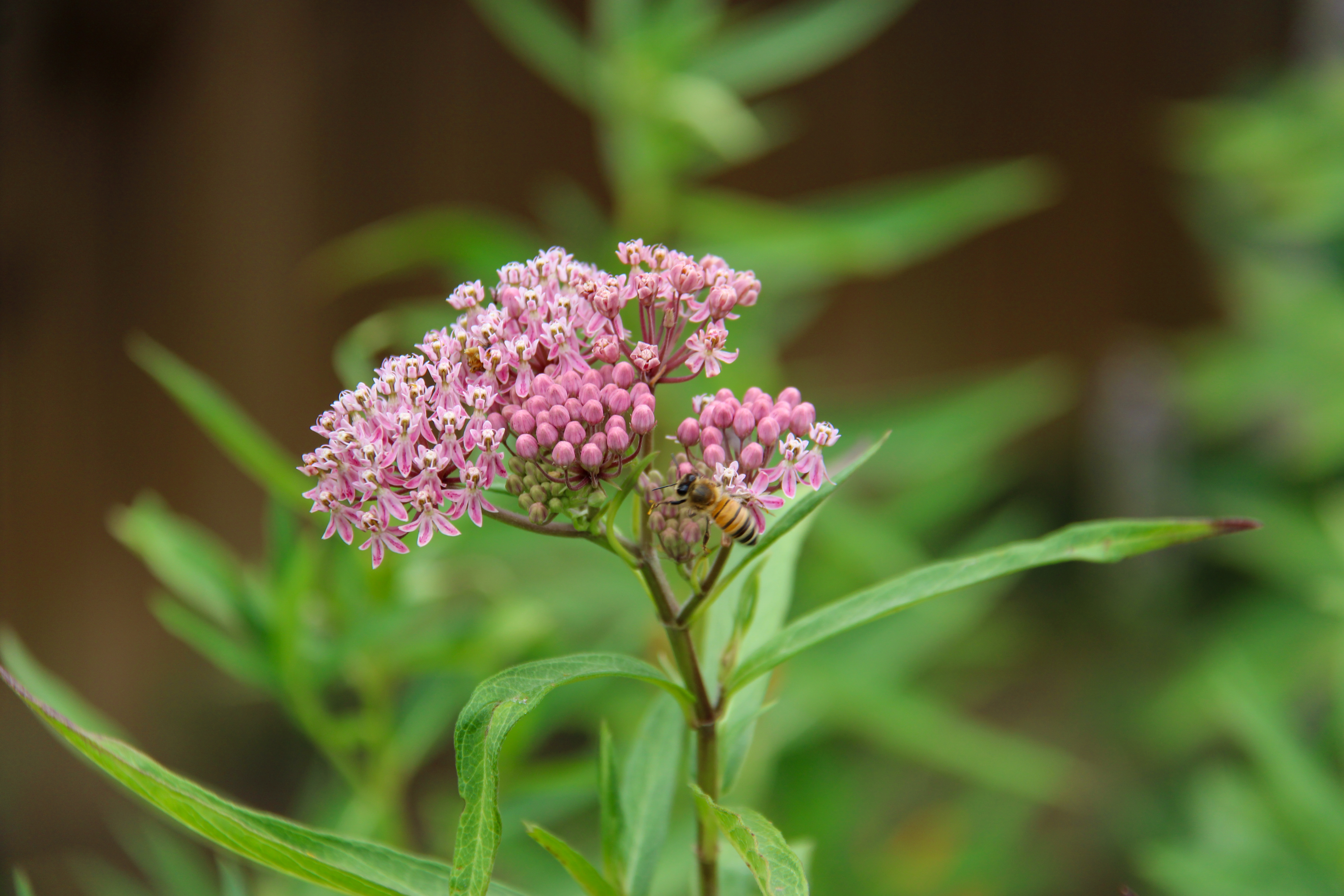
Asclepias incarnata flowers

== See also ==
- List of Asclepias species
