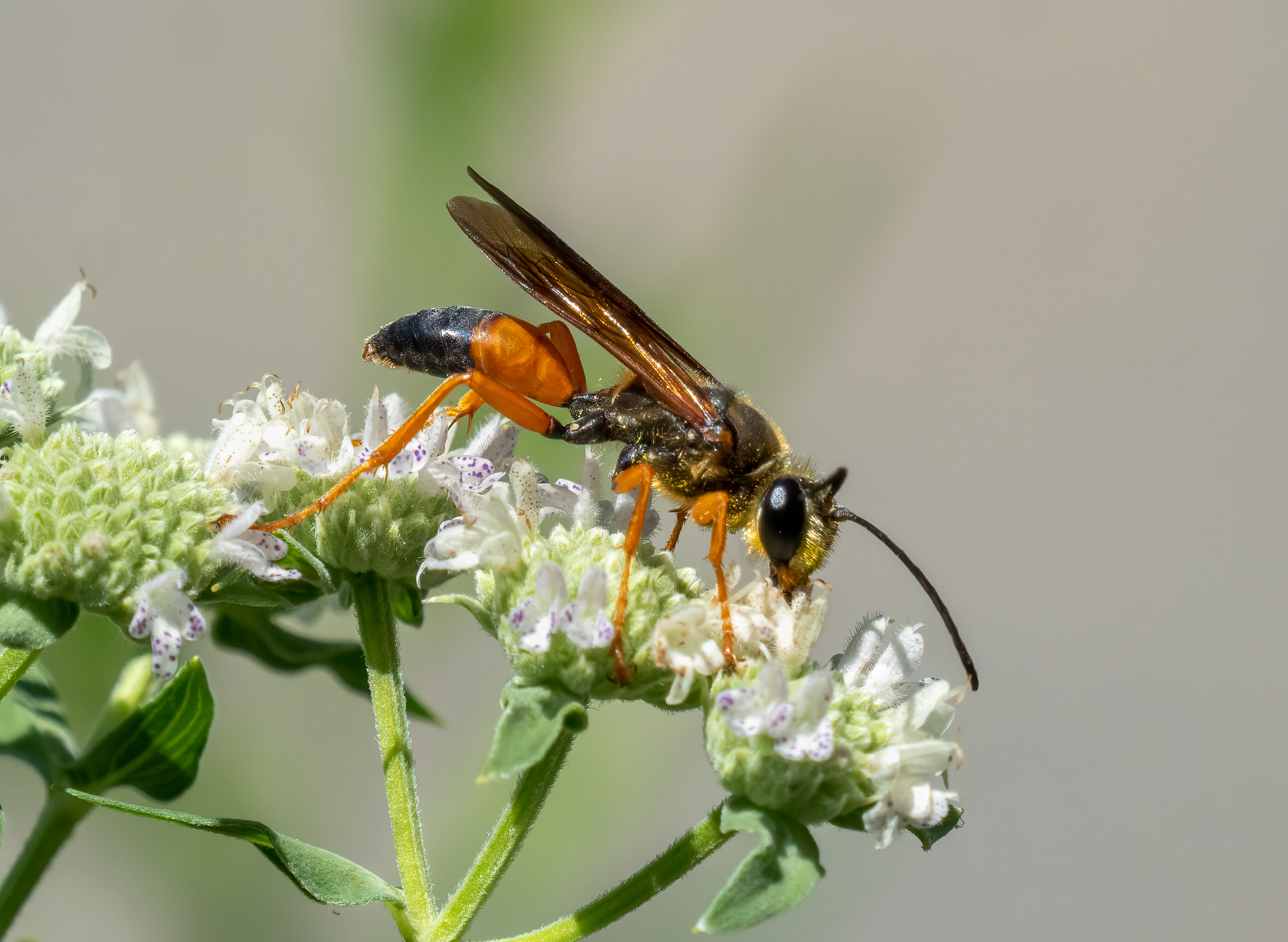

Scientific classification
- Kingdom: Animalia
- Phylum: Arthropoda
- Clade: Pancrustacea
- Class: Insecta
- Order: Hymenoptera
- Family: Sphecidae
- Genus: Sphex
- Species: S. ichneumoneus

Binomial name
- Sphex ichneumoneus (Linnaeus, 1758)

Synonyms
- Apis ichneumonea Linnaeus, 1758; Nomada surinamensis Retzius, 1783; Sphex aurifluus Perty, 1833; Sphex aurocapillus Templeton, 1841; Sphex croesus Lepeletier, 1845; Sphex dimidiatus Lepeletier, 1845; Sphex sumptuosus A. Costa, 1862

= Sphex ichneumoneus =

Species of wasp

Great golden digger wasp on narrow leaf milkweed. Part is shown at one tenth speed.

Sphex ichneumoneus, known commonly as the great golden digger wasp or great golden sand digger is a wasp in the family Sphecidae. It is identified by the golden pubescence on its head and thorax, its reddish orange legs, and partly reddish orange body. This wasp is native to the Western Hemisphere, from Canada to South America, and provisions its young with various types of paralyzed Orthoptera.

Douglas Hofstadter cites the observation by Woodridge of S. ichneumoneus continually repeating behavior (checking a burrow before pulling in a cricket) as an example of genetic determinism, calling the behavior "sphexish". It is an example of a fixed action pattern, as described by H.J. Brockmann, where the sign stimulus is the sight of paralyzed prey in correct orientation (head facing burrow) and position (≤3 cm from entrance in alignment with the dug mound) and the behavioral sequence is to pull the prey into the burrow by its antennae, if present (otherwise the wasp will position the prey outside, go into the burrow alone, reemerge headfirst and reevaluate, although it may uncommonly attempt to pull the prey in by another part of its body). The burrow of the great golden sand digger consists of a descending shaft with individual brood chambers arranged at right angles to it. This arrangement makes it difficult to pull prey into a brood chamber without getting stuck and is one possible reason why the wasp always checks to ensure the path is clear before preferentially pulling its prey down by its antennae. In addition, female wasps commonly build their burrows nearby those of other females of their species and may even share a nest, but will fight with other wasps if they encounter them inside their burrow during prey retrieval. Thus, an unattended nest may pose a risk to a laden wasp if it has not been inspected first.
