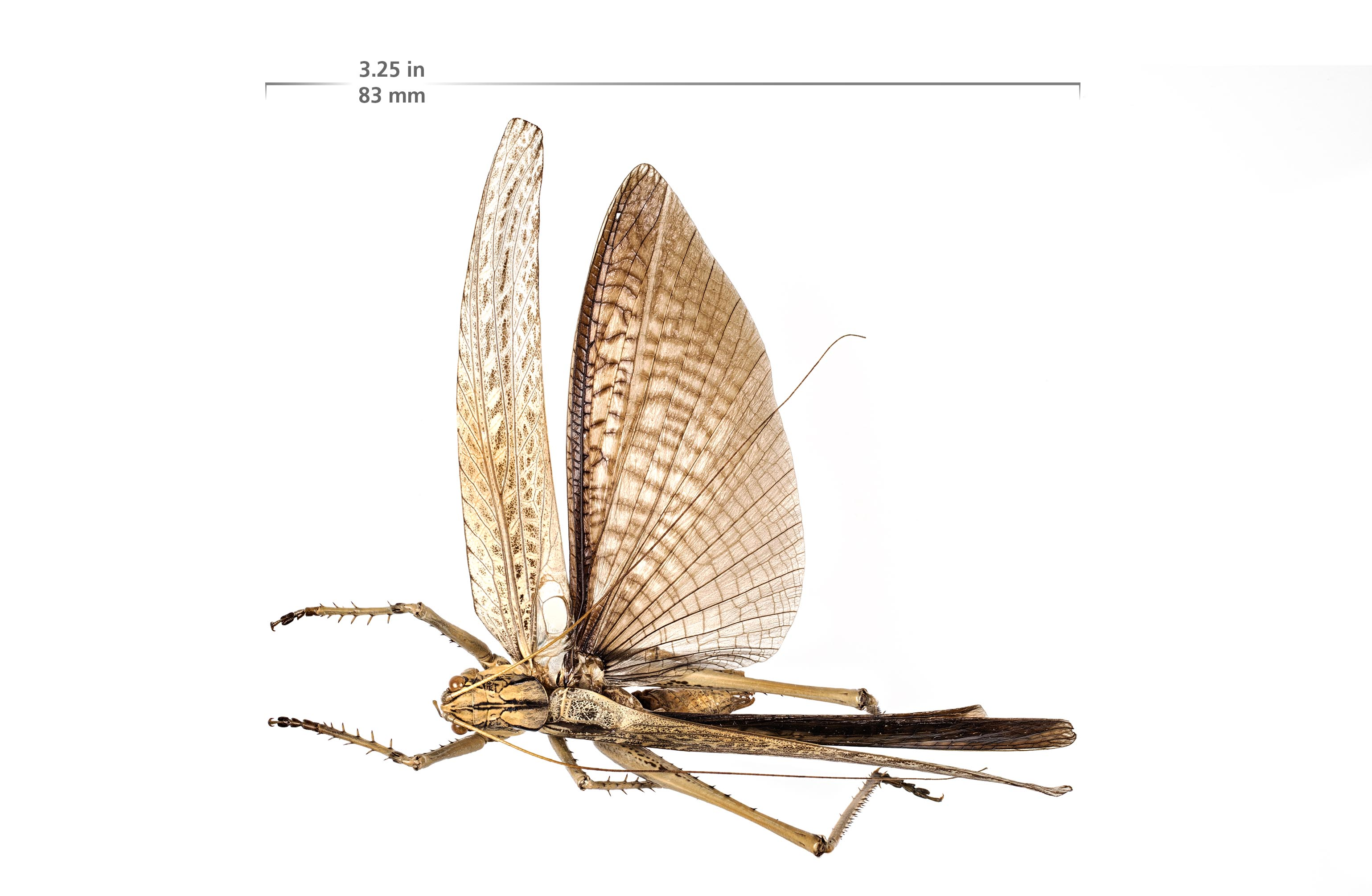

Scientific classification
- Domain: Eukaryota
- Kingdom: Animalia
- Phylum: Arthropoda
- Class: Insecta
- Order: Orthoptera
- Suborder: Ensifera
- Family: Tettigoniidae
- Genus: Capnobotes
- Species: C. fuliginosus

Binomial name
- Capnobotes fuliginosus (Thomas, 1872)

Synonyms
- Locusta fuliginosus Thomas, 1872

= Capnobotes fuliginosus =

Species of cricket-like animal

Capnobotes fuliginosus is a species of katydid known as the sooty longwing. It is found in the western United States and Mexico. It is omnivorous and it is the prey of the wasp Palmodes praestans.

The sooty longwing was first formally described in 1872 by Cyrus Thomas as Locusta fuliginosus.

== Description ==
The species is up to 75 mm (3.0 in) long to its wingtips, brownish gray, has long wings, has a shield back, and its hindwings are darker than its forewings. The katydids show their dark hindwings when they are startled. The species' song is loud, continuous, and shrill. It is an omnivore that is known to feed on the nymphs and adults of the grasshopper Bootettix argentatus on foliage during the summer.

== Habitat and range ==
The species can be found in central Nevada, Utah, southern California, New Mexico, Texas, and Colorado. They are found in the deserts of California. The species was first found at the Dinosaur National Monument in 1952, according to a 1952 study by Entomological News in which three adults were discovered. They are highly active on hot nights.

== Predators ==
Nematodes use the species as a host. The wasp Palmodes praestans preys on the species, even though the wasp is smaller. In a 1919 publication from the Proceedings of the Entomological Society of Washington, it was noted that the species is prey for the wasp despite its "large size" and "formidable nature". In a 2005 study about the mating system of the wasp by the Journal of Natural History, a specimen of the wasp was recorded as having dragged the katydid's instar into its burrow. It was mentioned in the 2005 study because the only report up to that time on the wasp was of it feeding on the katydid.
