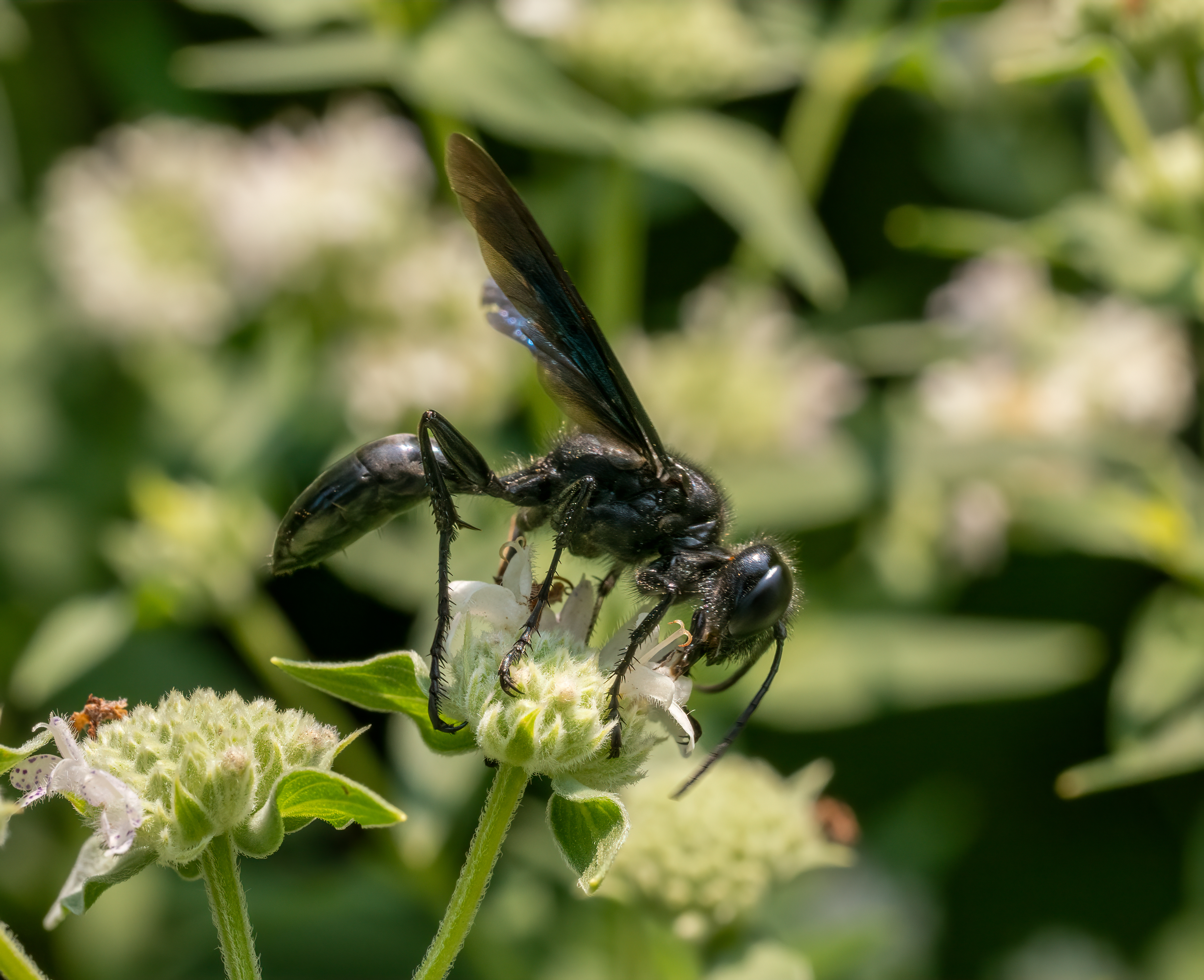
- Lateral view
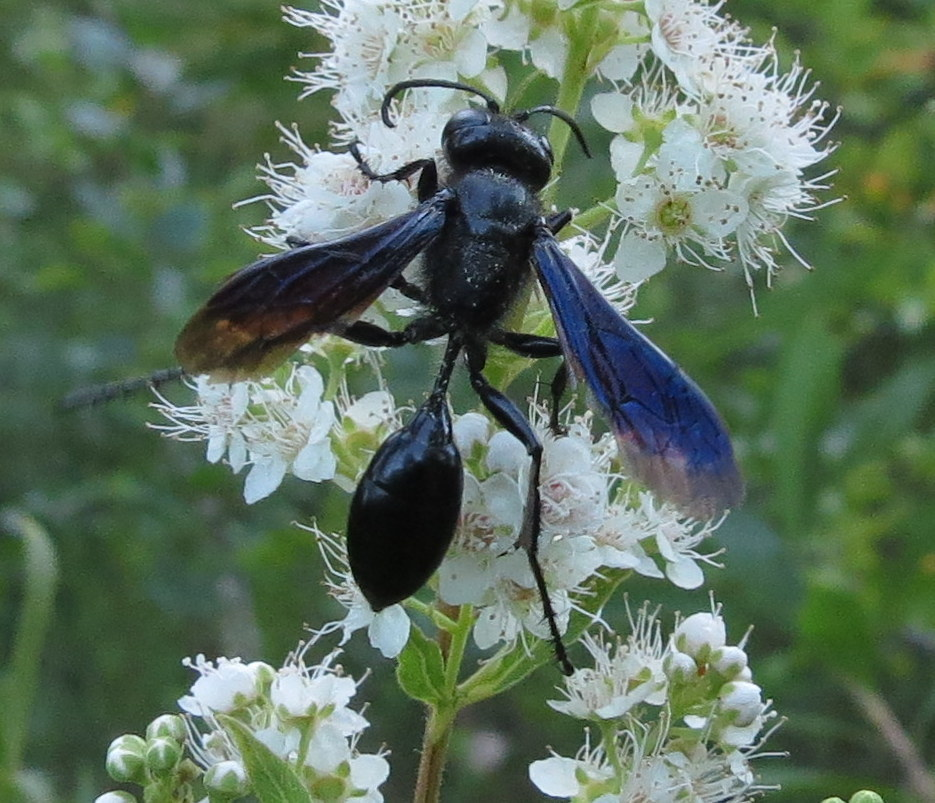
- Dorsal view

Scientific classification
- Kingdom: Animalia
- Phylum: Arthropoda
- Class: Insecta
- Order: Hymenoptera
- Family: Sphecidae
- Tribe: Sphecini
- Genus: Isodontia
- Species: I. philadelphica

Binomial name
- Isodontia philadelphica (Lepeletier de Saint Fargeau, 1845)

Synonyms
- Sphex aztecus digueti Berland, 1926; Sphex macrocephalus W. Fox, 1890; Sphex philadelphicus Lepeletier de Saint Fargeau, 1845

= Isodontia philadelphica =

Species of wasp

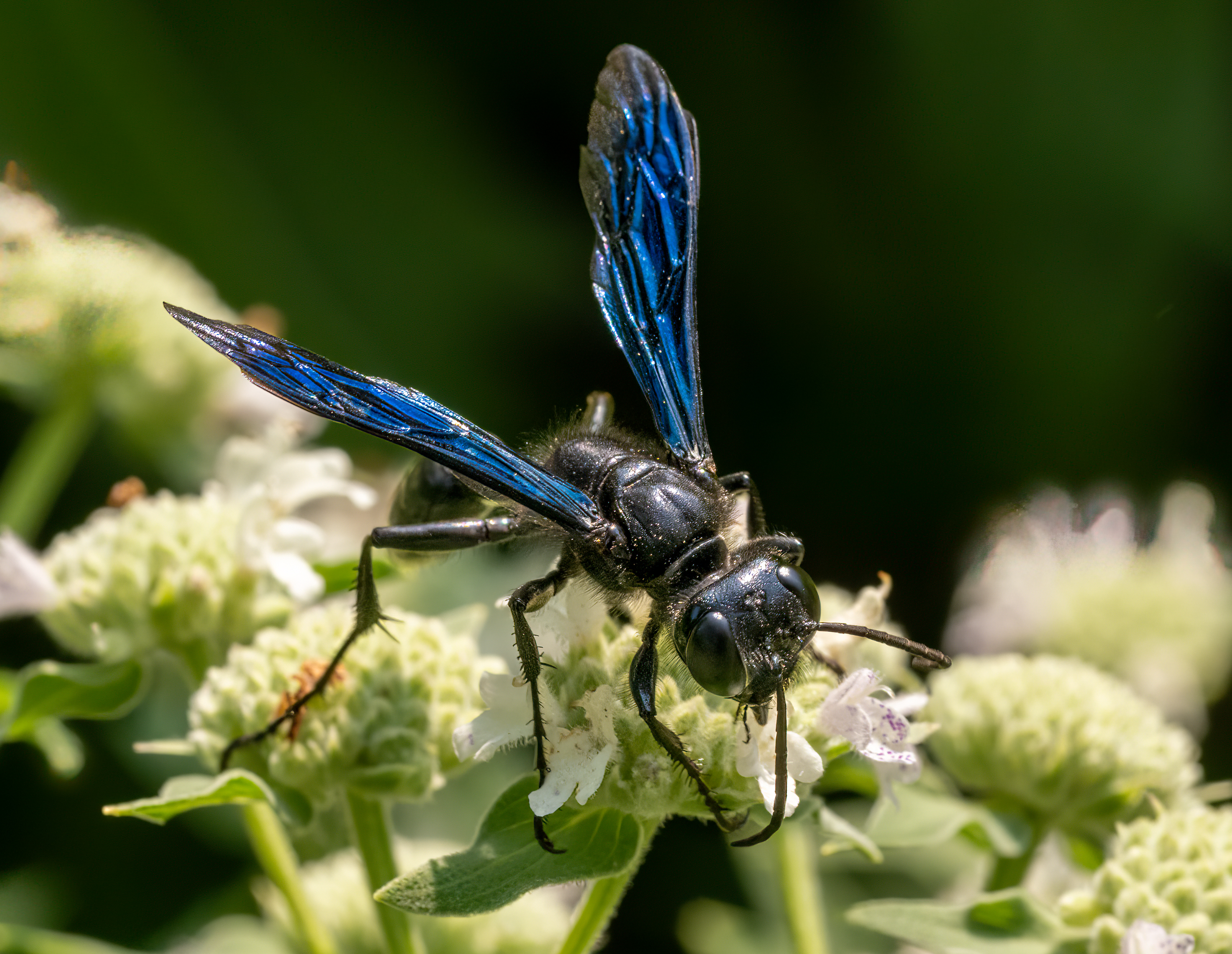
I. philadelphica in New York

Isodontia philadelphica is a species of thread-waisted wasp in the family Sphecidae.
