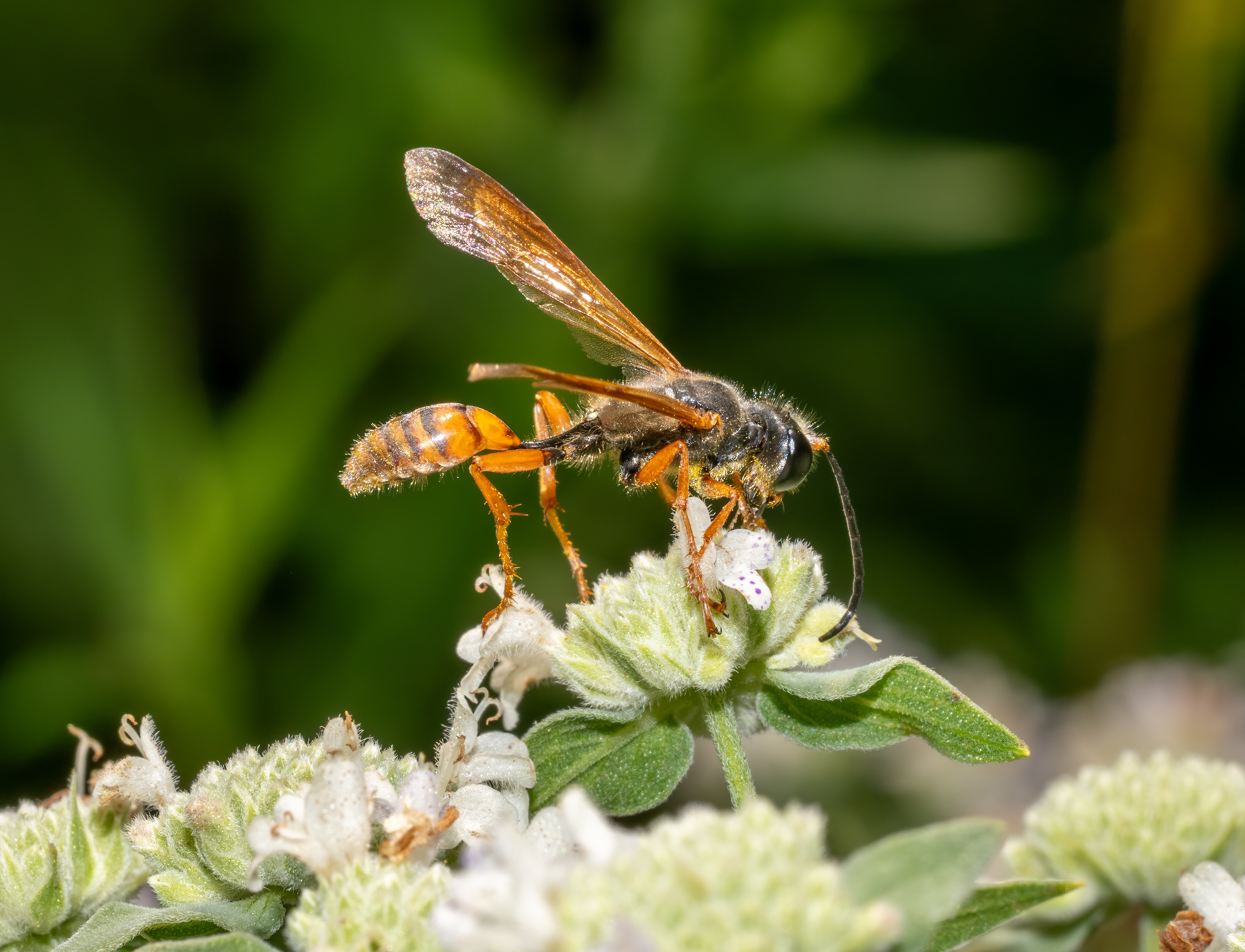

Scientific classification
- Kingdom: Animalia
- Phylum: Arthropoda
- Class: Insecta
- Order: Hymenoptera
- Family: Sphecidae
- Tribe: Sphecini
- Genus: Isodontia
- Species: I. elegans

Binomial name
- Isodontia elegans (F. Smith, 1856)

Synonyms
- Sphex elegans F. Smith, 1856

= Isodontia elegans =

Species of wasp

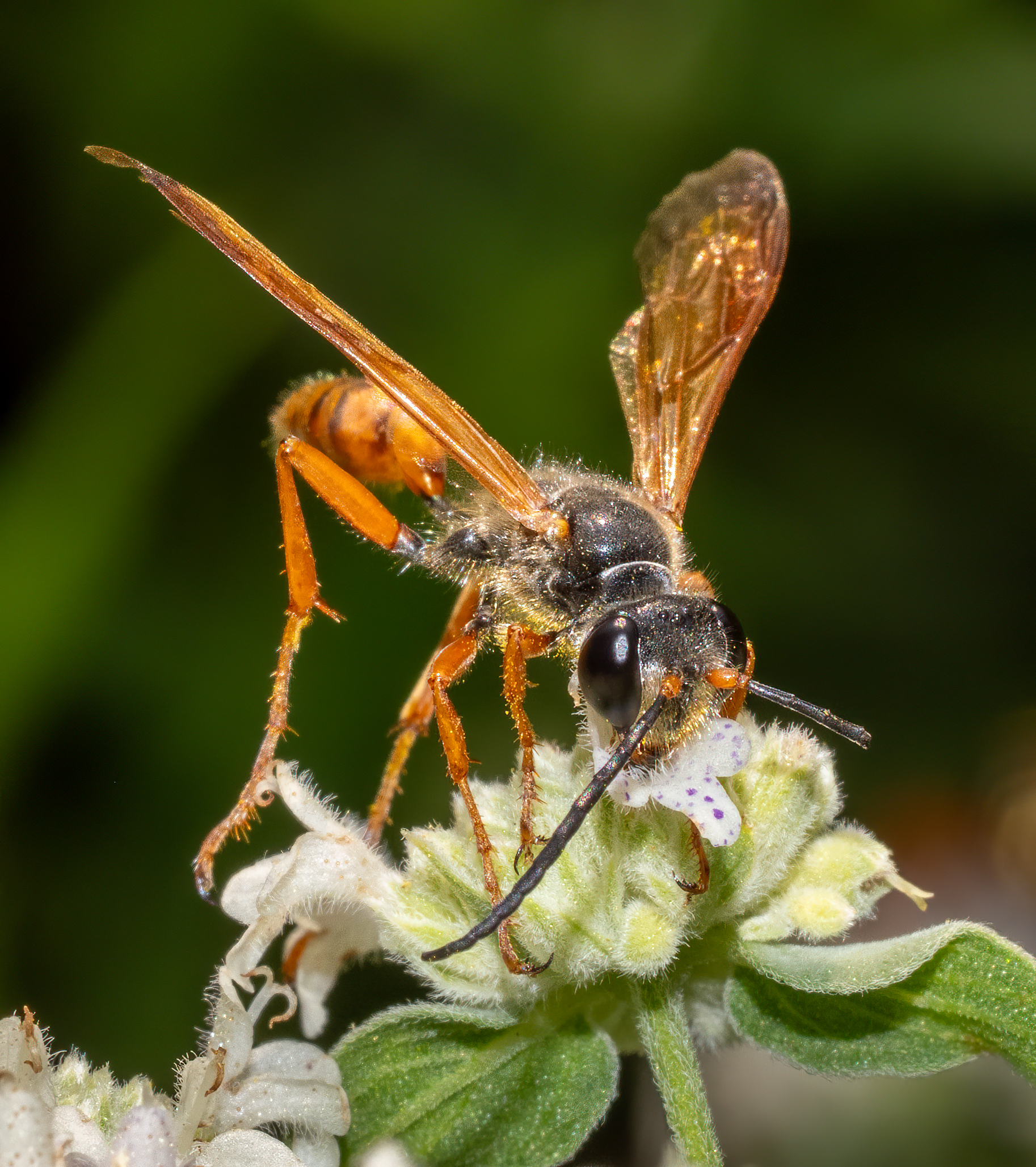
I. elegans on mountain mint

Isodontia elegans, also known as the elegant grass-carrying wasp, is a species of solitary, nest-provisioning, thread-waisted wasp in the family Sphecidae that hunts orthopterans (grasshoppers, crickets, bush crickets, locusts, etc.).

I. elegans is described as having a generally black-color body, rusty-red to yellowish abdomen, and see-through wings with some tinting. They were originally considered to be a species of western and southern North America, but have been found in the northeastern corner of the continent in increasing numbers. They seem to use pre-existing holes created by other insects for their nests and then outfit them with "finely chewed fibers of dead weeds and grass." The grass serves as a defensive barrier at one end of the nest; it keeps parasites from entering while the larvae feed on the paralyzed insects which have been stored in the nursery.

Isodontia elegans may be attracted to same kind of nest holes that appeal to blue orchard mason bees.
