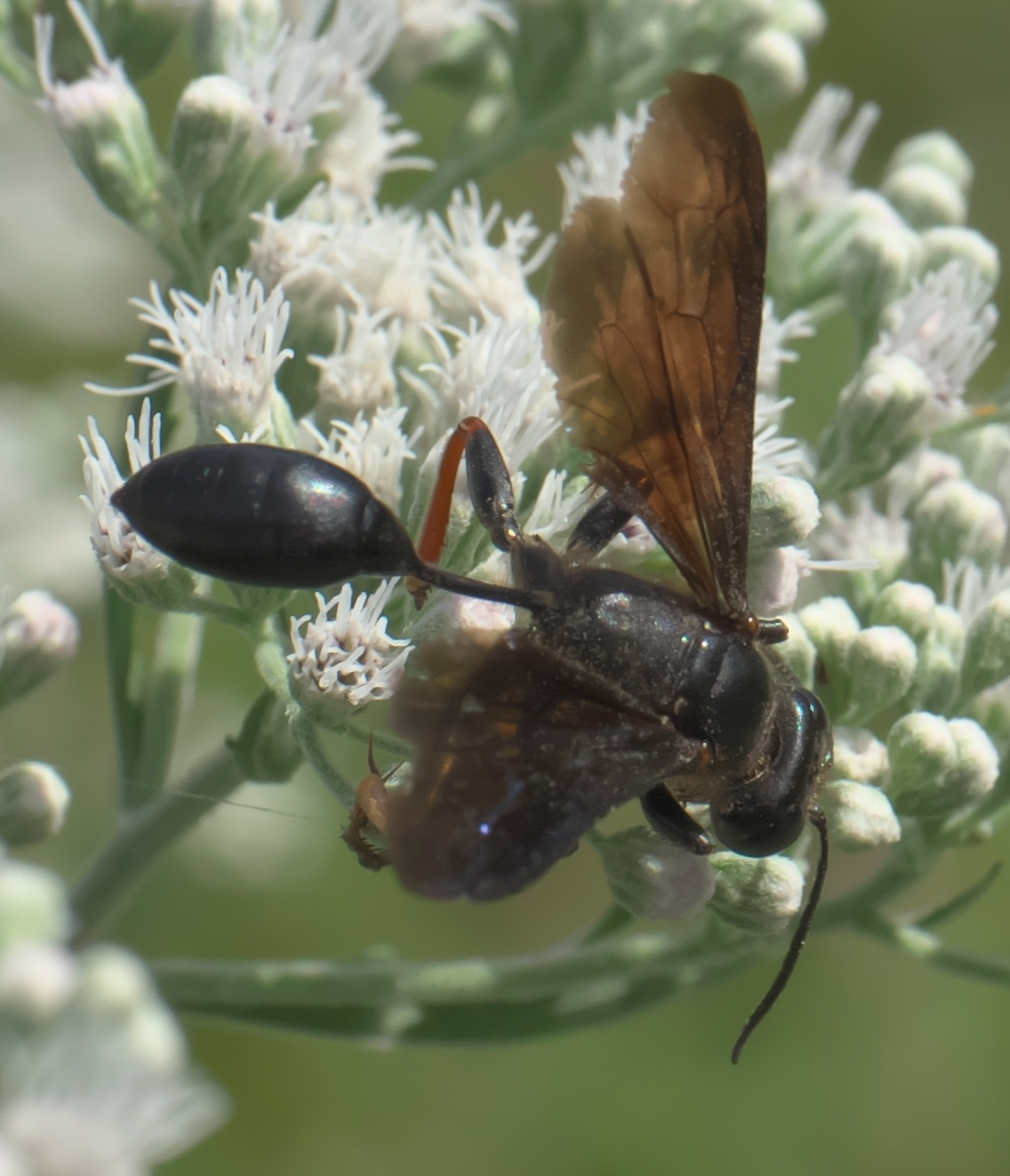

Scientific classification
- Domain: Eukaryota
- Kingdom: Animalia
- Phylum: Arthropoda
- Class: Insecta
- Order: Hymenoptera
- Family: Sphecidae
- Tribe: Sphecini
- Genus: Isodontia
- Species: I. auripes

Binomial name
- Isodontia auripes (Fernald, 1906)

Synonyms
- Chlorion auripes Fernald, 1906

= Isodontia auripes =

Species of wasp

Isodontia auripes, the brown-legged grass-carrier, is a species of thread-waisted wasp in the family Sphecidae. The wasp will opportunistically use old nests made by Xylocopa virginica or mining bees. Larvae eat for three days and then spend two forming pupae. Oecanthus is a common prey item throughout I. auripes' range. I. auripes lives along the east coast of the United States.

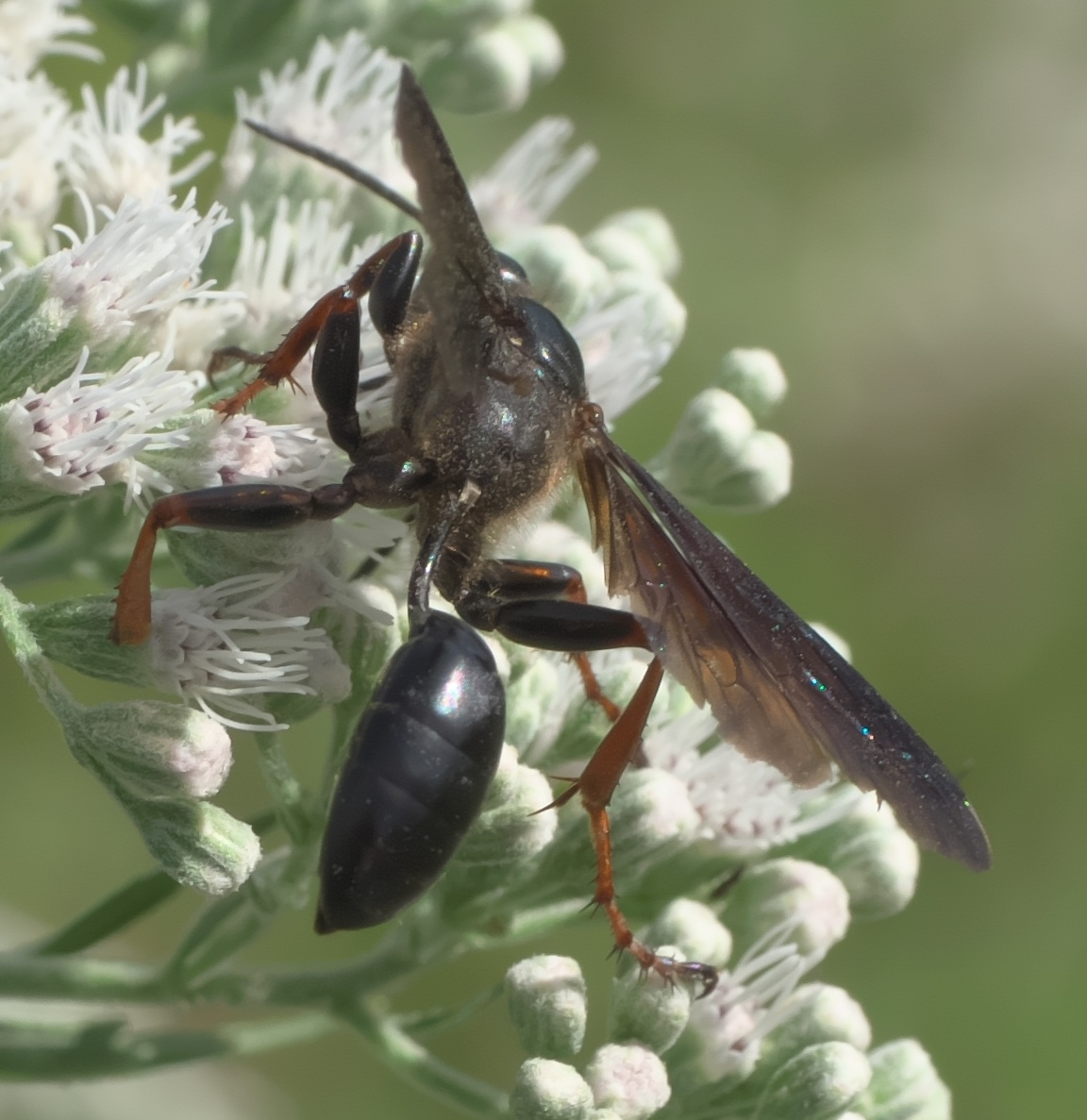
Brown-legged grass-carrier, Isodontia auripes
