= Acrolophitus maculipennis =

Scientific classification
- Kingdom: Animalia
- Phylum: Arthropoda
- Clade: Pancrustacea
- Class: Insecta
- Order: Orthoptera
- Suborder: Caelifera
- Family: Acrididae
- Tribe: Acrolophitini
- Genus: Acrolophitus
- Species: A. maculipennis

Binomial name
- Acrolophitus maculipennis (Scudder, 1890)

Species of grasshopper

Acrolophitus maculipennis, known generally as the Texas point-head grasshopper or black fool grasshopper, is a species of slant-faced grasshopper in the family Acrididae. It is found in Central America, North America, and Mexico.
