= Isodontia apicalis =

Scientific classification
- Domain: Eukaryota
- Kingdom: Animalia
- Phylum: Arthropoda
- Class: Insecta
- Order: Hymenoptera
- Family: Sphecidae
- Tribe: Sphecini
- Genus: Isodontia
- Species: I. apicalis

Binomial name
- Isodontia apicalis (F. Smith, 1856)

Synonyms
- Isodontia cinerea Fernald, 1903; Isodontia macrocephala cinerea Fernald, 1903; Sphex apicalis F. Smith, 1856

Species of wasp

Isodontia apicalis is a species of thread-waisted wasp in the family Sphecidae from North and Central America.
