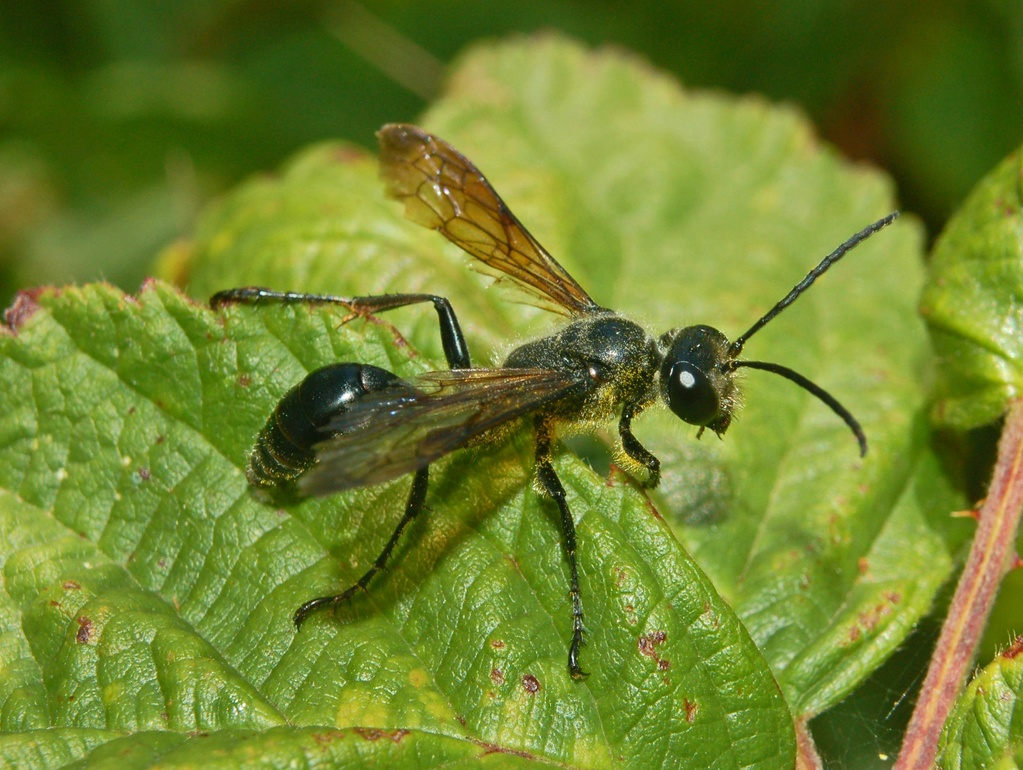
- Isodontia mexicana

Scientific classification
- Kingdom: Animalia
- Phylum: Arthropoda
- Class: Insecta
- Order: Hymenoptera
- Family: Sphecidae
- Subfamily: Sphecinae
- Tribe: Sphecini
- Genus: Isodontia (Patton, 1880)

= Isodontia =

Genus of insects

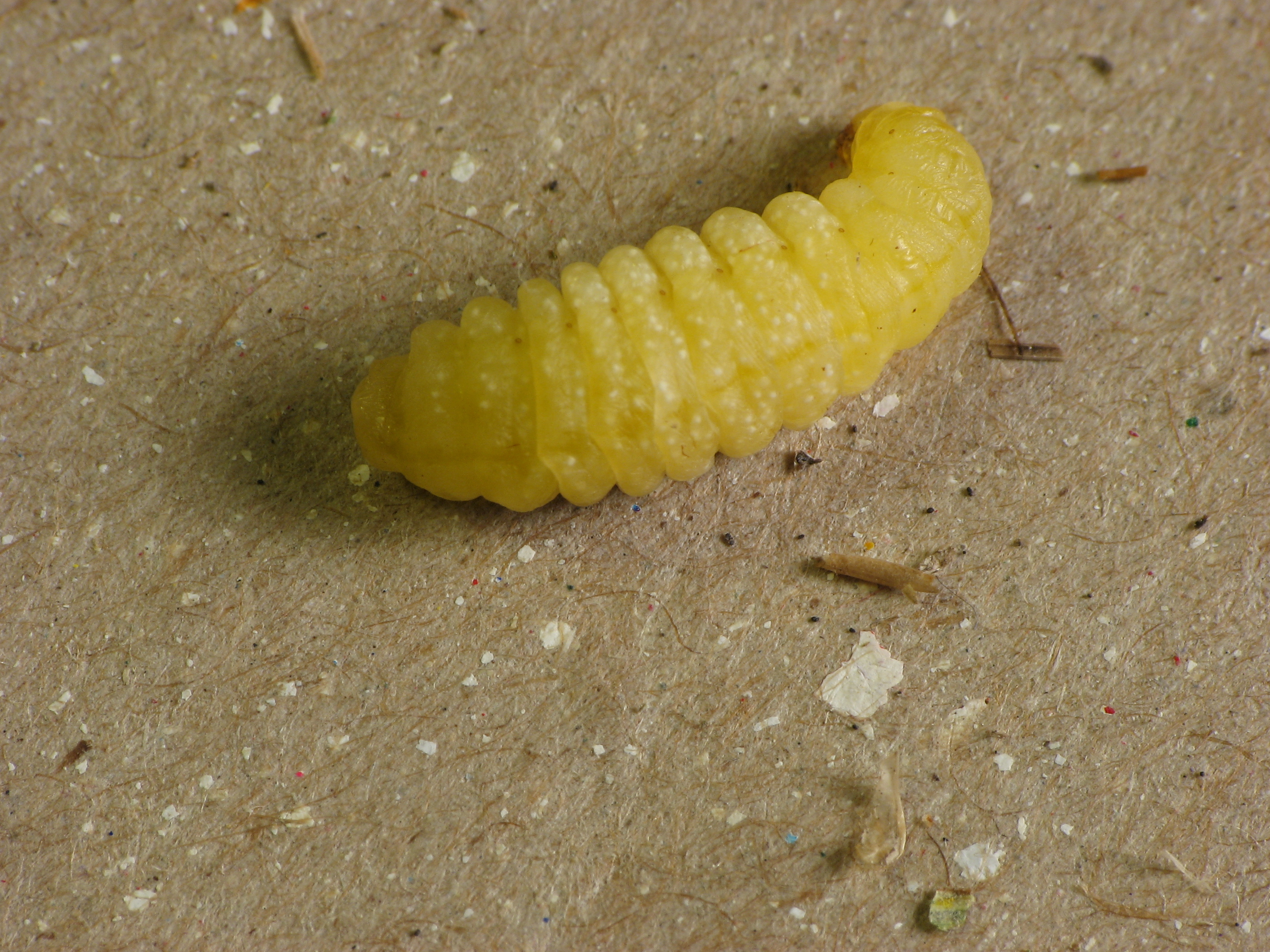
Larva of Isodontia sp. found in twig nest with katydid prey

Isodontia (from Greek ισος + όδονς 'equal teeth') is a genus belonging to the family Sphecidae. Adults emerge from their cocoons in early summer, and usually make nests lined with grass or hay in hollow plant cavities. This has led to their common name being grass-carrying wasps. The larvae are often fed Orthoptera that the adult has paralyzed.

== Species ==
Species within this genus include:

- Isodontia albata
- Isodontia alvarengai
- Isodontia apicalis
- Isodontia apicata
- Isodontia aurifrons
- Isodontia auripes
- Isodontia auripygata
- Isodontia azteca
- Isodontia bastiniana
- Isodontia boninensis
- Isodontia bruneri
- Isodontia capillata
- Isodontia cellicula
- Isodontia cestra
- Isodontia chrysorrhoea
- Isodontia costipennis
- Isodontia cyanipennis
- Isodontia delicata
- Isodontia diodon
- Isodontia dolosa
- Isodontia edax
- Isodontia egens
- Isodontia elegans
- Isodontia elsei
- Isodontia exornata
- Isodontia formosicola
- Isodontia franzi
- Isodontia fuscipennis
- Isodontia guaranitica
- Isodontia harmandi
- Isodontia immaculata
- Isodontia jaculator
- Isodontia laevipes
- Isodontia leonina
- Isodontia longiventris
- Isodontia maidli
- Isodontia mexicana
- Isodontia nidulans
- Isodontia nigella
- Isodontia nigelloides
- Isodontia obscurella
- Isodontia ochroptera
- Isodontia paludosa
- Isodontia papua
- Isodontia paranensis
- Isodontia pelopoeiformis
- Isodontia pempuchi
- Isodontia permutans
- Isodontia petiolata
- Isodontia philadelphica
- Isodontia pilipes
- Isodontia poeyi
- Isodontia praslinia
- Isodontia sepicola
- Isodontia severini
- Isodontia simoni
- Isodontia sonani
- Isodontia splendidula
- Isodontia stanleyi
- Isodontia vanlinhi
- Isodontia vidua
- Isodontia visseri
