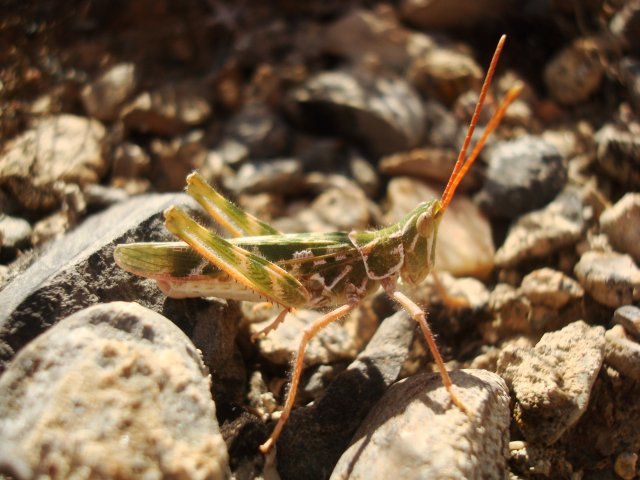

Conservation status
- Vulnerable (IUCN 2.3)

Scientific classification
- Kingdom: Animalia
- Phylum: Arthropoda
- Clade: Pancrustacea
- Class: Insecta
- Order: Orthoptera
- Suborder: Caelifera
- Family: Acrididae
- Genus: Acrolophitus
- Species: A. pulchellus

Binomial name
- Acrolophitus pulchellus (Bruner, 1890)

= Acrolophitus pulchellus =

Species of grasshopper

Acrolophitus pulchellus is a species of grasshopper in the family Acrididae. It is endemic to Idaho in the United States. Its common name is Idaho point-headed grasshopper.

This grasshopper occurs in a limited range, mostly in Clark and Custer Counties in Idaho. It lives in dry, sparsely vegetated shrubland habitat on foothills and in floodplains. An important host plant for the insect is stemless mock goldenweed (Stenotus acaulis).

This grasshopper is a mottled "apple green" and white in color, the male with a reddish tinge. It has a pointed face, threadlike antennae, and a coat of soft hairs all over its body. The average male is about 22 millimeters long, while the average female is about 32 millimeters.
