= Palmodes =

Scientific classification
- Domain: Eukaryota
- Kingdom: Animalia
- Phylum: Arthropoda
- Class: Insecta
- Order: Hymenoptera
- Family: Sphecidae
- Subfamily: Sphecinae
- Tribe: Prionychini
- Genus: Palmodes; Kohl, 1890

Genus of wasps

Palmodes is a genus of thread-waisted wasps in the family Sphecidae. There are more than 20 described species in Palmodes.

== Species ==
These 21 species belong to the genus Palmodes:

- Palmodes californicus R. Bohart & Menke, 1961
- Palmodes carbo Bohart & Menke, 1963
- Palmodes dimidiatus (De Geer, 1773)
- Palmodes garamantis (Roth, 1959)
- Palmodes hesperus Bohart & Menke, 1961
- Palmodes insularis Bohart & Menke, 1961
- Palmodes laeviventris (Cresson, 1865)
- Palmodes lissus Bohart & Menke, 1961
- Palmodes melanarius (Mocsáry, 1883)
- Palmodes minor (F. Morawitz, 1890)
- Palmodes occitanicus (Lepeletier de Saint Fargeau & Serville, 1828)
- Palmodes orientalis (Mocsáry, 1883)
- Palmodes pacificus Bohart & Menke, 1961
- Palmodes palmetorum (Roth, 1963)
- Palmodes parvulus (Roth in de Beaumont, 1967)
- Palmodes praestans (Kohl, 1890)
- Palmodes pusillus (Gussakovskij, 1930)
- Palmodes rufiventris
- Palmodes sagax (Kohl, 1890)
- Palmodes strigulosus (A. Costa, 1861)
- Palmodes stygicus Bohart & Menke, 1961
