= Acrolophitus nevadensis =

Scientific classification
- Kingdom: Animalia
- Phylum: Arthropoda
- Clade: Pancrustacea
- Class: Insecta
- Order: Orthoptera
- Suborder: Caelifera
- Family: Acrididae
- Genus: Acrolophitus
- Species: A. nevadensis

Binomial name
- Acrolophitus nevadensis (Thomas, 1873)

Species of grasshopper

Acrolophitus nevadensis, or Nevada point-head grasshopper, is a species of slant-faced grasshoppers in the family Acrididae. It is found in North America.
