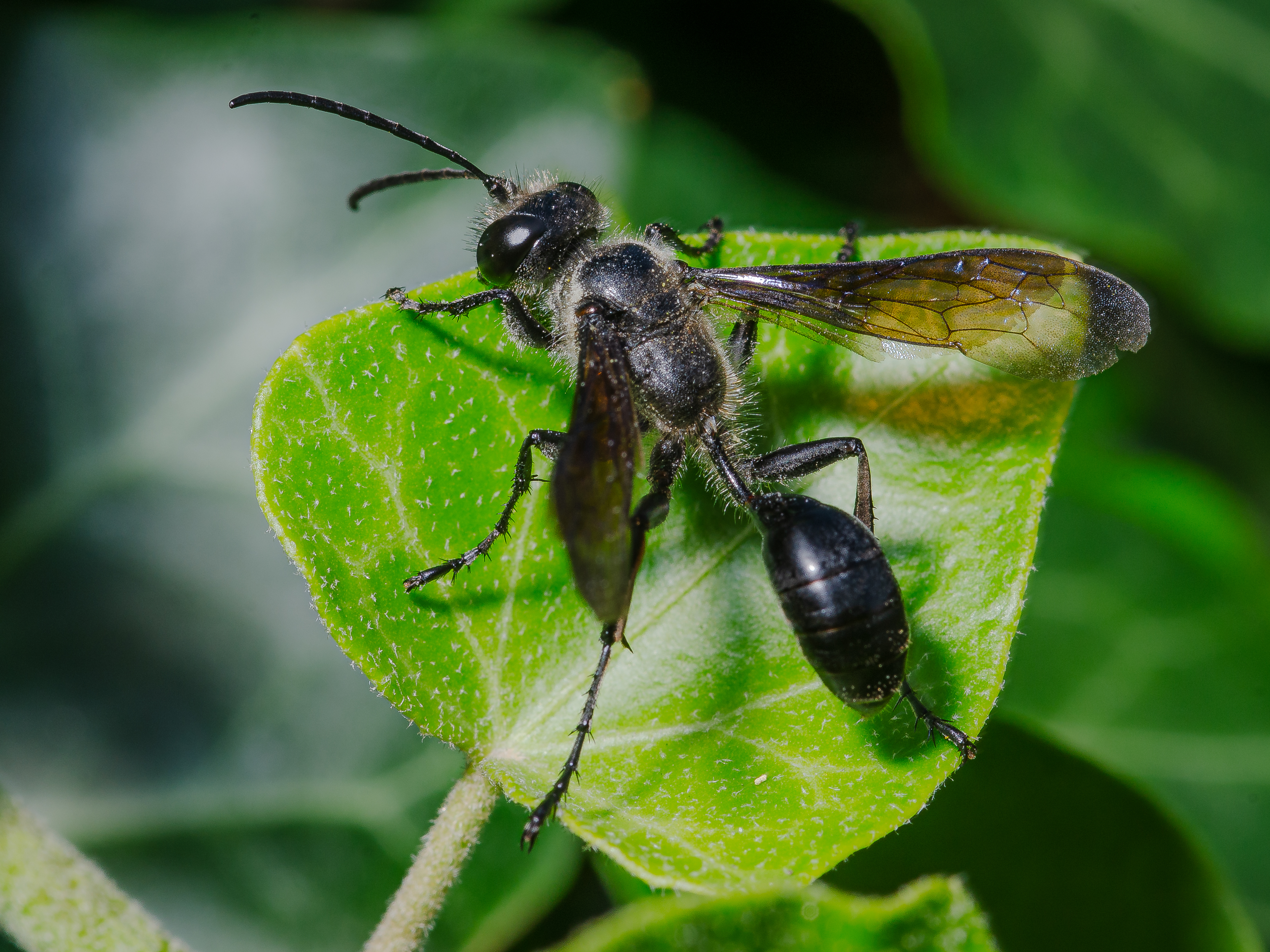

Scientific classification
- Kingdom: Animalia
- Phylum: Arthropoda
- Class: Insecta
- Order: Hymenoptera
- Family: Sphecidae
- Genus: Isodontia
- Species: I. mexicana

Binomial name
- Isodontia mexicana (Saussure, 1867)

= Isodontia mexicana =

Species of wasp

Isodontia mexicana, the Mexican grass-carrying wasp, is a species of insect belonging to the family Sphecidae. It is mainly found throughout North America, but has become established in Europe, primarily France, Switzerland, Hungary, Italy, Serbia, and Spain.

The adults grow up to 18–20 millimetres (0.71–0.79 in) long, the body is completely black, the thorax is quite hairy and the wings have a smoky-brown color. They can be encountered from early summer through September. Females are larger and emerge as adults later in the season than males.

Isodontia mexicana is a typical case of a species arrived accidentally from North America and slowly encroaching on the European continent, probably for the lack of predators or parasites.

These wasps build their nests in hollowed branches or in other natural cavities, often reusing the nests of other species. Then they line the inside with grass fragments or other plant fibers (hence the name of 'grass-carrying wasps').

Isodontia mexicana mainly preys on grasshoppers (usually katydids, Tettigoniidae species) or tree crickets (Gryllidae species), choosing the small ones and carrying them to its nest to feed the emerging larvae with the living, but paralyzed Orthoptera.

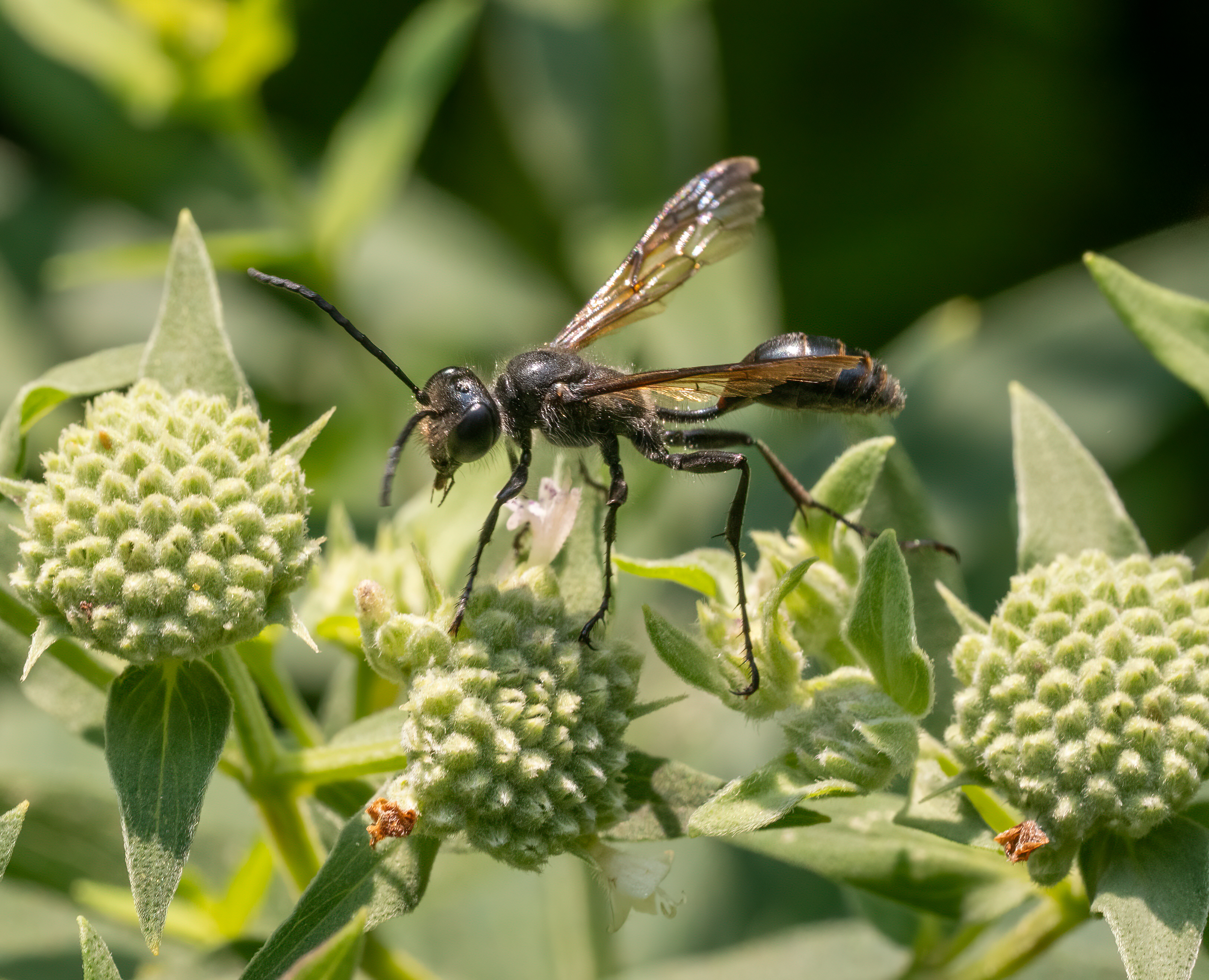
Lateral view

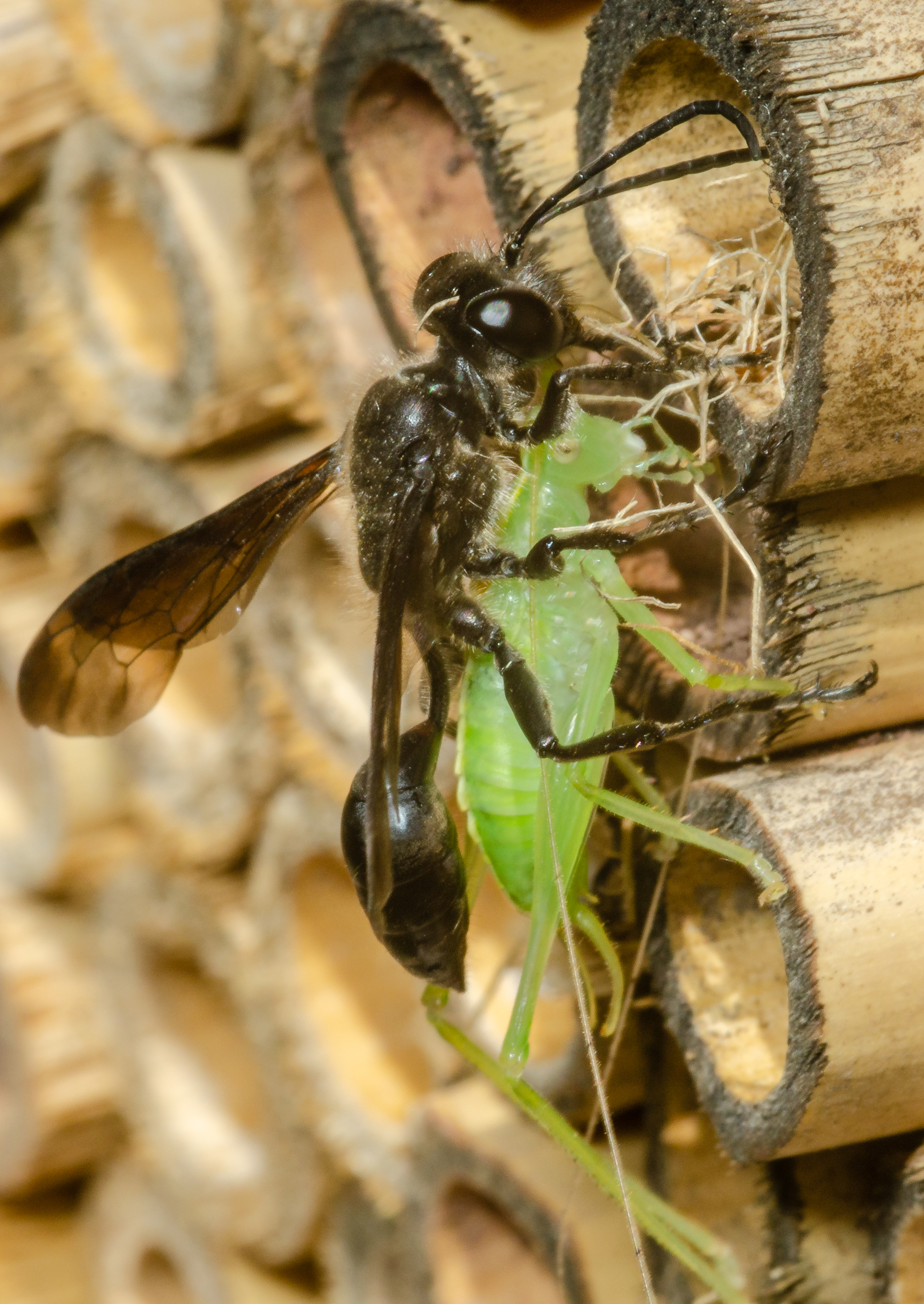
Prey

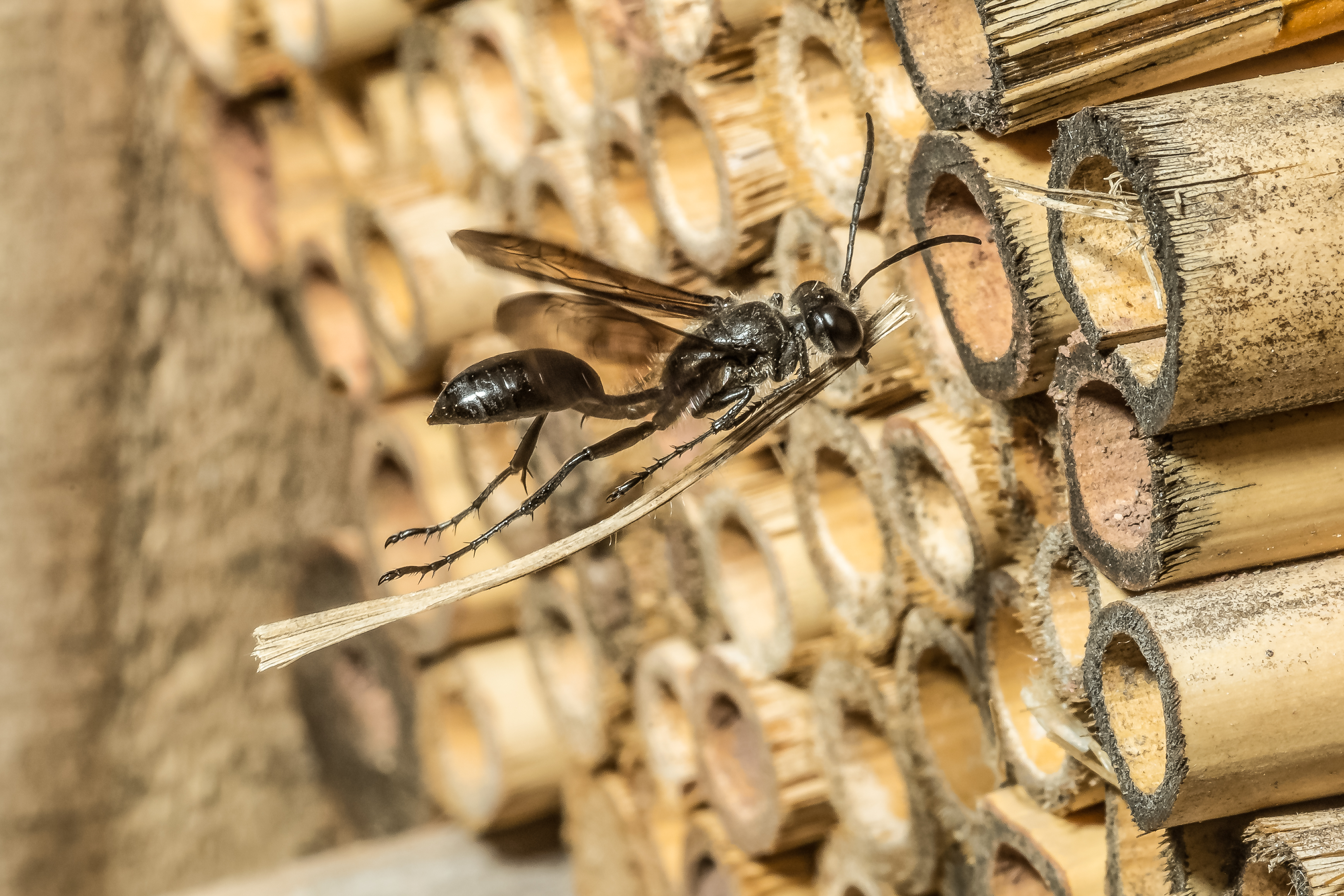
In flight carrying nesting material

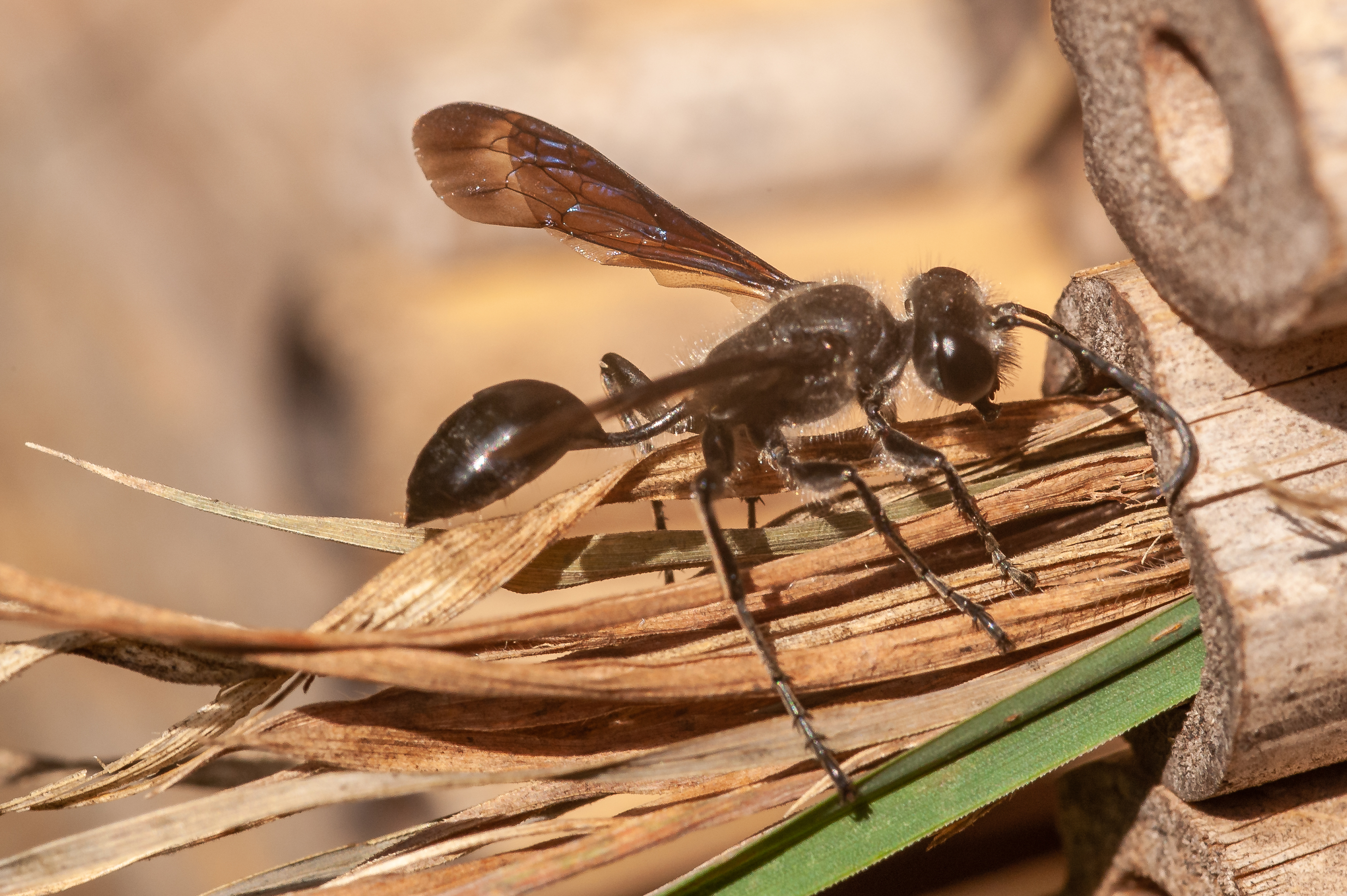
Nest closure
