= Capnobotes bruneri =

Scientific classification
- Domain: Eukaryota
- Kingdom: Animalia
- Phylum: Arthropoda
- Class: Insecta
- Order: Orthoptera
- Suborder: Ensifera
- Family: Tettigoniidae
- Tribe: Tettigoniini
- Genus: Capnobotes
- Species: C. bruneri

Binomial name
- Capnobotes bruneri Scudder, 1897

Species of cricket-like animal

Capnobotes bruneri, the Bruner longwing, is a species of shield-backed katydid in the family Tettigoniidae. It is found in North America.
