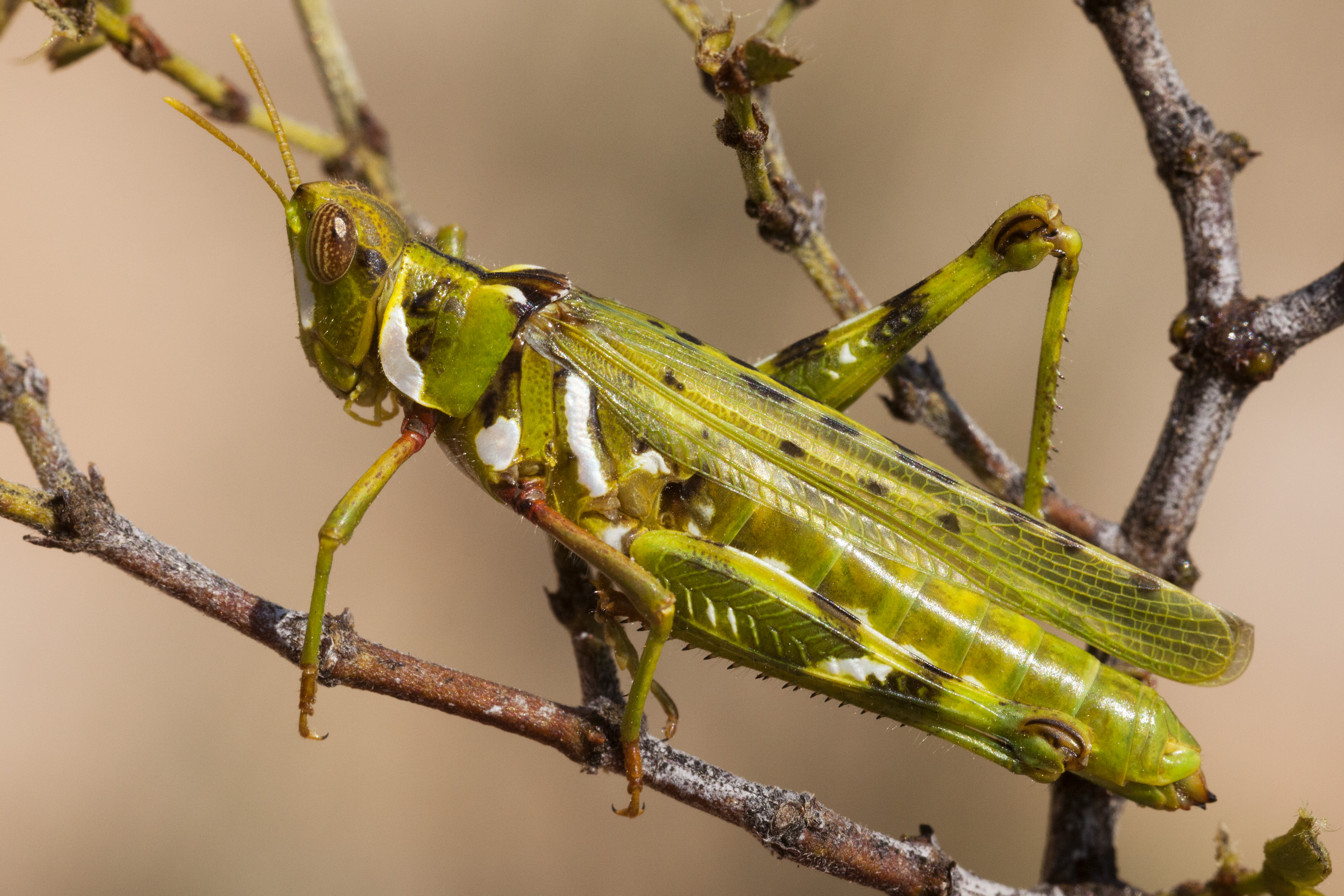

Scientific classification
- Kingdom: Animalia
- Phylum: Arthropoda
- Class: Insecta
- Order: Orthoptera
- Suborder: Caelifera
- Family: Acrididae
- Tribe: Acrolophitini
- Genus: Bootettix
- Species: B. argentatus

Binomial name
- Bootettix argentatus Bruner, 1890

= Bootettix argentatus =

Species of grasshopper

Bootettix argentatus, the creosote bush grasshopper, is a species of slant-faced grasshopper in the family Acrididae. It is found in Central America and North America. The species is monophagous, and feeds exclusively on the creosote bush Larrea divaricata.
