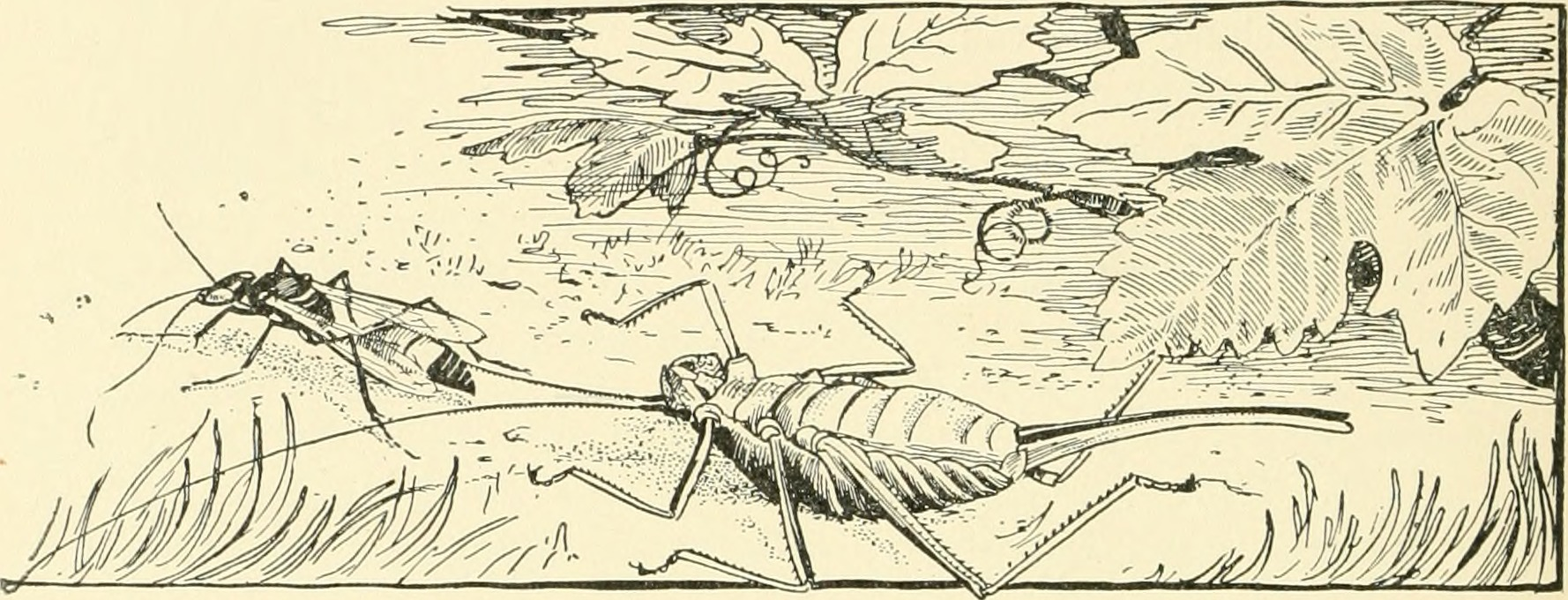
- A solitary wasp, Sphex occitanica, dragging a large wingless locustid (Ephippiger) to nest. After Fabre (natural size) According to Fauna Europa Sphex occitanica Lepeletier & Serville, 1828 is now Palmodes occitanicus (Lepeletier & Serville, 1828)

Scientific classification
- Domain: Eukaryota
- Kingdom: Animalia
- Phylum: Arthropoda
- Class: Insecta
- Order: Hymenoptera
- Family: Sphecidae
- Genus: Palmodes
- Species: P. occitanicus

Binomial name
- Palmodes occitanicus (Lepeletier de saint Fargeau & Audinet-Serville, 1828)

Synonyms
- Sphex occitanica (Le Peletier de Saint-Fargeau & Audinet-Serville, 1828); Sphex occitanicus (Lepeletier de Saint Fargeau and Serville, 1828)

= Palmodes occitanicus =

Sphex languedocian or sand wasp

Species of wasp

Palmodes occitanicus is a species of thread-waisted wasp in the family Sphecidae.

The reproduction behaviour of this species (called the "Sphex languedocien" at the time) is described in detail by the French entomologist, Jean-Henri Fabre, in 1879, in a story intended to convince people that animals are not rational. The wasp normally stings and paralyzes an Ephippiger or related orthopteran prey, and brings it back to its burrow; it leaves the prey item near the entrance, enters the burrow, lays an egg, and then drags the prey item into the burrow where the egg can hatch nearby and the wasp larva can feed. If the prey item is moved while the wasp is in the nest, it will exit, become confused, then grab and reposition the prey near the entrance, and reenter the nest; if the prey is moved again before the wasp reemerges, it will continue the process indefinitely.
