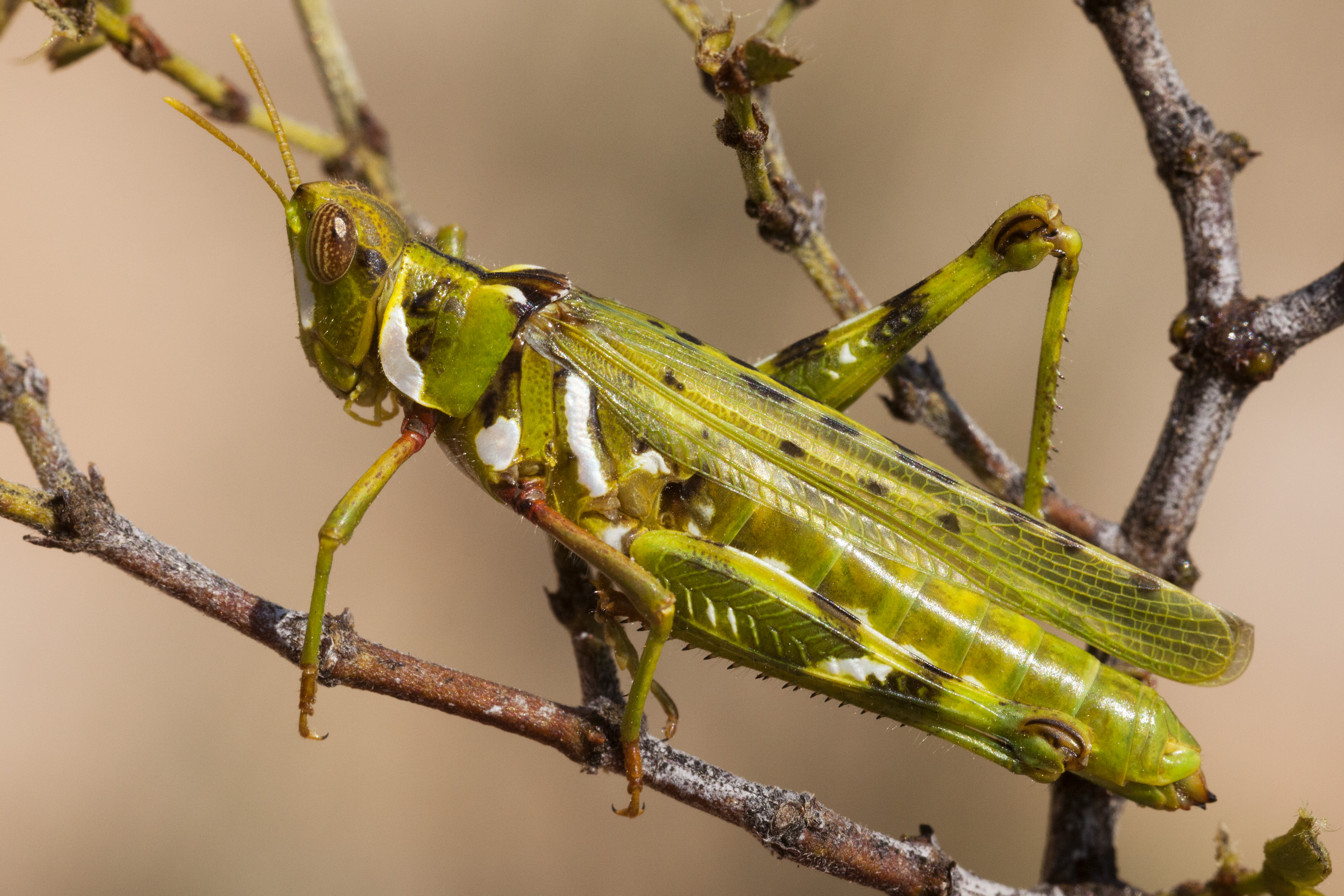
- B. argentatus

Scientific classification
- Domain: Eukaryota
- Kingdom: Animalia
- Phylum: Arthropoda
- Class: Insecta
- Order: Orthoptera
- Suborder: Caelifera
- Family: Acrididae
- Subfamily: Gomphocerinae
- Tribe: Acrolophitini
- Genus: Bootettix; Bruner, 1890

= Bootettix =

Genus of grasshoppers

Bootettix is a genus of slant-faced grasshoppers in the family Acrididae. There are at least two described species in Bootettix.

== Species ==
These two species belong to the genus Bootettix:

- Bootettix argentatus Bruner, 1890 — creosote bush grasshopper
- Bootettix joerni Otte, 1979
