= Capnobotes occidentalis =

Scientific classification
- Domain: Eukaryota
- Kingdom: Animalia
- Phylum: Arthropoda
- Class: Insecta
- Order: Orthoptera
- Suborder: Ensifera
- Family: Tettigoniidae
- Tribe: Tettigoniini
- Genus: Capnobotes
- Species: C. occidentalis

Binomial name
- Capnobotes occidentalis (Thomas, 1872)

Species of cricket-like animal

Capnobotes occidentalis, the western longwing, is a species of shield-backed katydid in the family Tettigoniidae. It is found in North America.
