= Isodontia exornata =

Scientific classification
- Domain: Eukaryota
- Kingdom: Animalia
- Phylum: Arthropoda
- Class: Insecta
- Order: Hymenoptera
- Family: Sphecidae
- Genus: Isodontia
- Species: I. exornata

Binomial name
- Isodontia exornata Fernald, 1903

Species of wasp

Isodontia exornata is a species of thread-waisted wasp in the family Sphecidae.
