= Palmodes dimidiatus =

Scientific classification
- Domain: Eukaryota
- Kingdom: Animalia
- Phylum: Arthropoda
- Class: Insecta
- Order: Hymenoptera
- Family: Sphecidae
- Tribe: Prionychini
- Genus: Palmodes
- Species: P. dimidiatus

Binomial name
- Palmodes dimidiatus (De Geer, 1773)

Synonyms
- Chlorion daggyi (Murray in Muesebeck et al., 1951); Chlorion rufiventris opuntiae Rohwer, 1911; Sphex abdominalis Cresson, 1873; Sphex daggyi Murray in Muesebeck et al., 1951; Sphex dimidiatus De Geer, 1773; Sphex rufiventris Cresson, 1873; Sphex violaceipennis Lepeletier de Saint Fargeau, 1845

Species of wasp

Palmodes dimidiatus is a species of thread-waisted wasp in the family Sphecidae.
