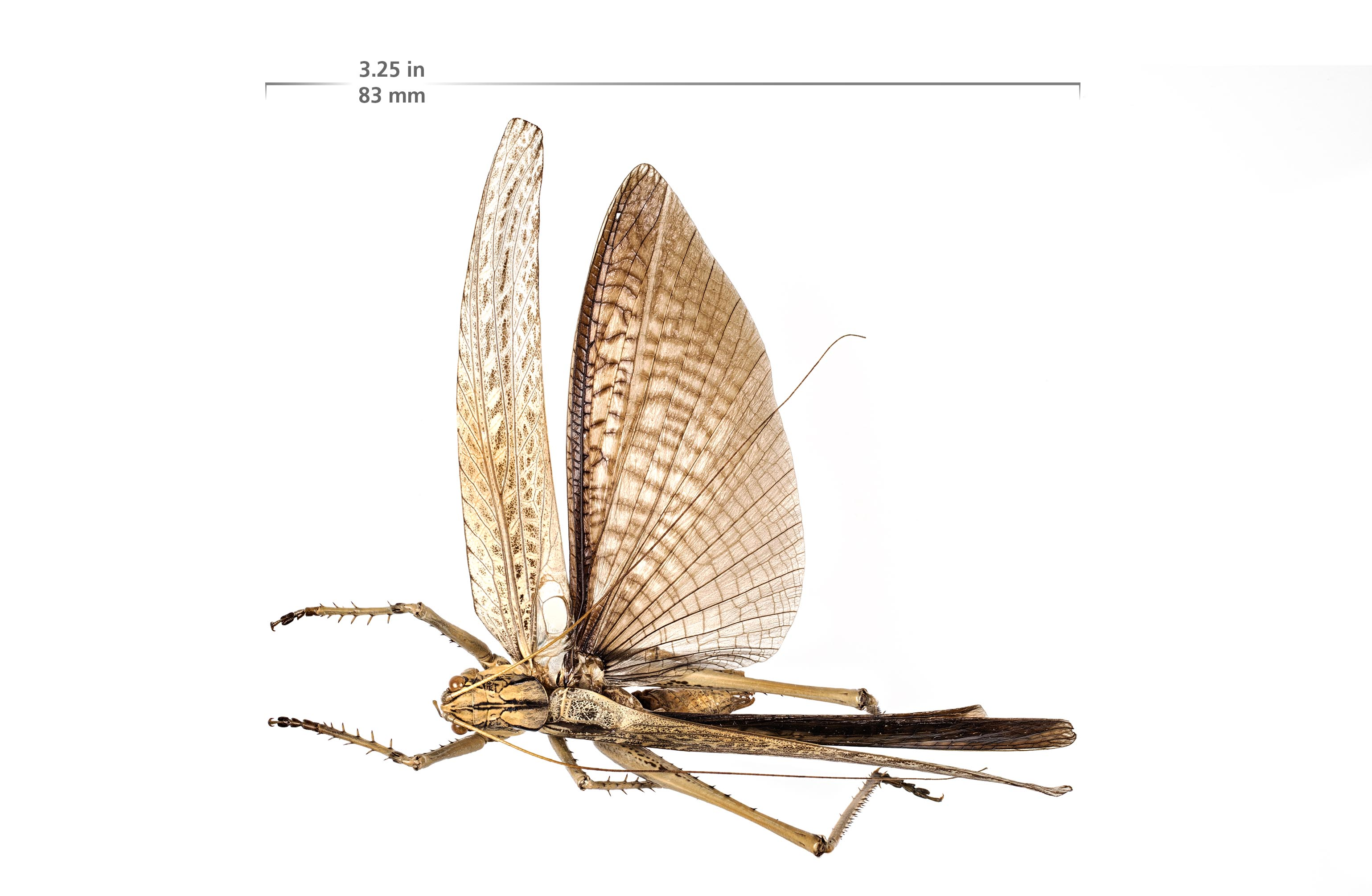
- Capnobotes fuliginosus

Scientific classification
- Domain: Eukaryota
- Kingdom: Animalia
- Phylum: Arthropoda
- Class: Insecta
- Order: Orthoptera
- Suborder: Ensifera
- Family: Tettigoniidae
- Subfamily: Tettigoniinae
- Tribe: Tettigoniini
- Genus: Capnobotes; Scudder, 1897

= Capnobotes =

Genus of cricket-like animals

Capnobotes is a North-American genus of shield-backed katydids in the family Tettigoniidae. There are about 9 described species in Capnobotes.

== Species ==
- Capnobotes arizonensis (Rehn, 1904) (Arizona longwing)
- Capnobotes attenuatus Rentz & Birchim, 1968 (slender longwing)
- Capnobotes bruneri Scudder, 1897 (Bruner longwing)
- Capnobotes fuliginosus (Thomas, 1872) (sooty longwing)
- Capnobotes granti Rentz & Birchim, 1968 (Grant longwing)
- Capnobotes imperfectus Rehn, 1901
- Capnobotes occidentalis (Thomas, 1872) (western longwing)
- Capnobotes spatulatus Rentz & Birchim, 1968 (spatulate longwing)
- Capnobotes unodontus Rentz & Birchim, 1968 (one-tooth longwing)
