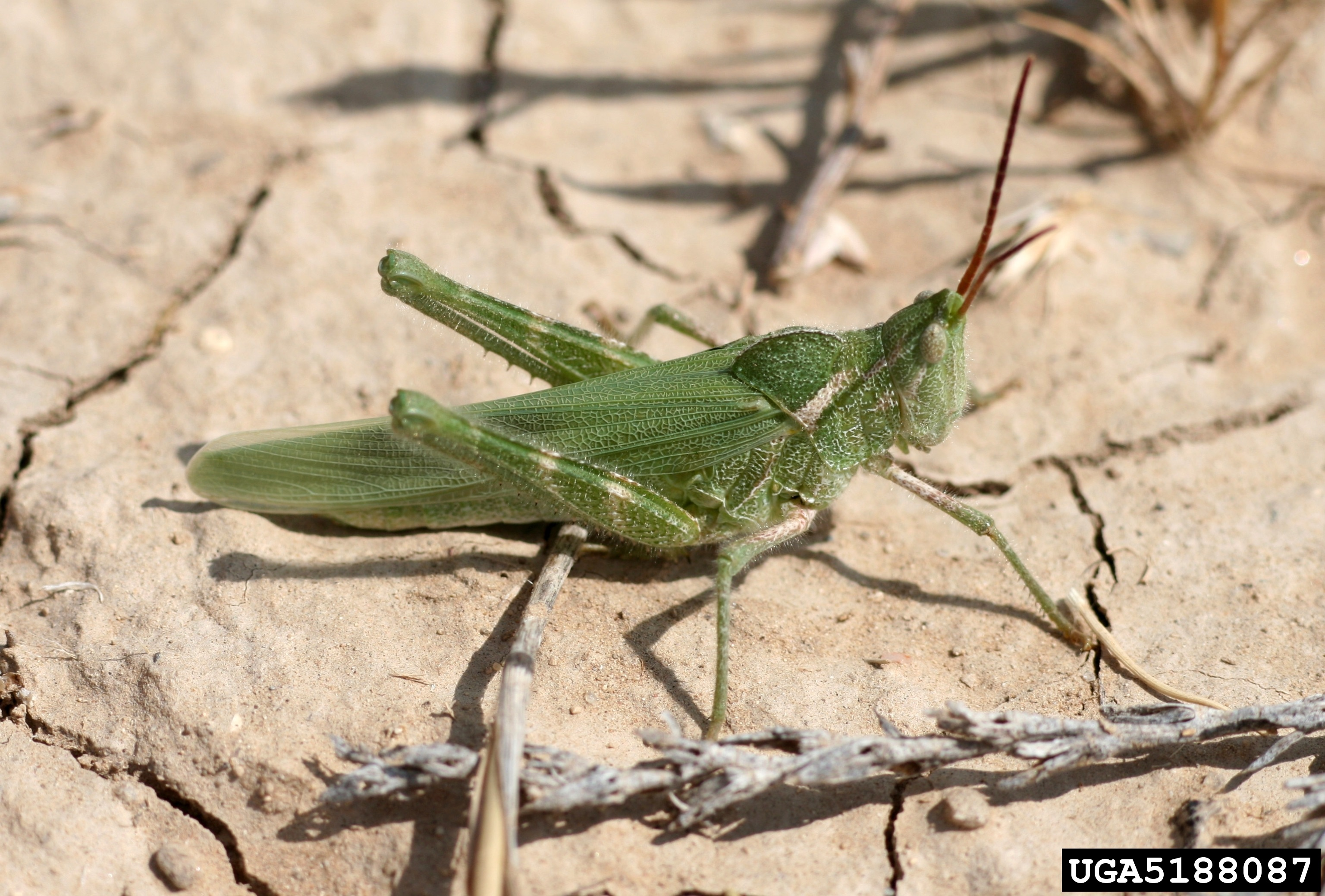
- Acrolophitus hirtipes

Scientific classification
- Kingdom: Animalia
- Phylum: Arthropoda
- Clade: Pancrustacea
- Class: Insecta
- Order: Orthoptera
- Suborder: Caelifera
- Family: Acrididae
- Subfamily: Gomphocerinae
- Tribe: Acrolophitini
- Genus: Acrolophitus; Thomas, 1871

= Acrolophitus =

Genus of grasshoppers

Acrolophitus is a genus of North American grasshoppers in the family Acrididae.

Species include:

- Acrolophitus hirtipes
- Acrolophitus maculipennis
- Acrolophitus nevadensis
- Acrolophitus pulchellus
