= Capnobotes unodontus =

Scientific classification
- Domain: Eukaryota
- Kingdom: Animalia
- Phylum: Arthropoda
- Class: Insecta
- Order: Orthoptera
- Suborder: Ensifera
- Family: Tettigoniidae
- Genus: Capnobotes
- Species: C. unodontus

Binomial name
- Capnobotes unodontus Rentz & Birchim, 1968

Species of cricket-like animal

Capnobotes unodontus, the one-tooth longwing, is a species of shield-backed katydid in the family Tettigoniidae. It is found in North America.
