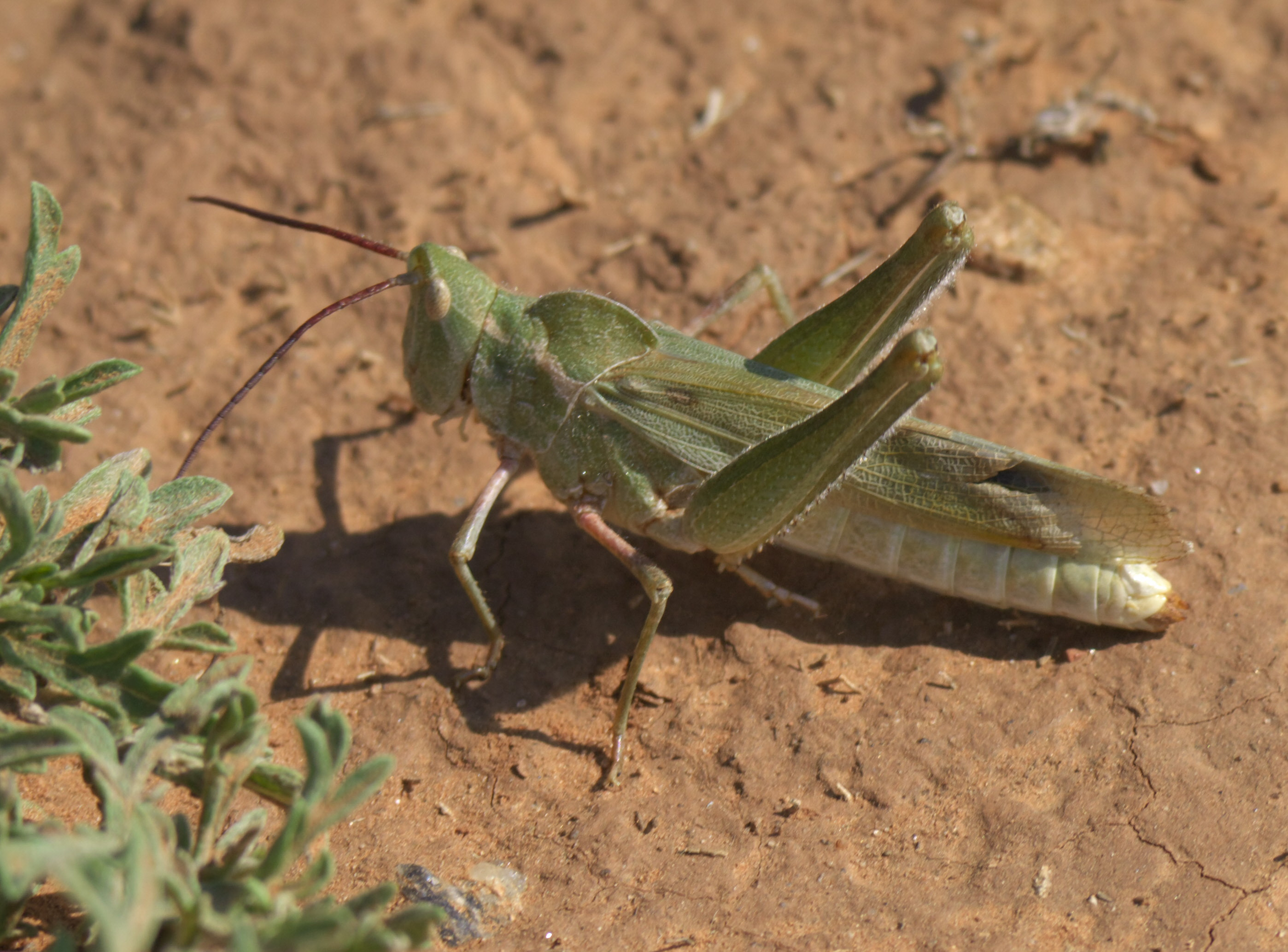

Scientific classification
- Kingdom: Animalia
- Phylum: Arthropoda
- Clade: Pancrustacea
- Class: Insecta
- Order: Orthoptera
- Suborder: Caelifera
- Family: Acrididae
- Genus: Acrolophitus
- Species: A. hirtipes

Binomial name
- Acrolophitus hirtipes (Say, 1825)

= Acrolophitus hirtipes =

Species of grasshopper

Acrolophitus hirtipes, known generally as the green fool grasshopper or plains point-head grasshopper, is a species of slant-faced grasshopper in the family Acrididae. It is found in Central America and North America.

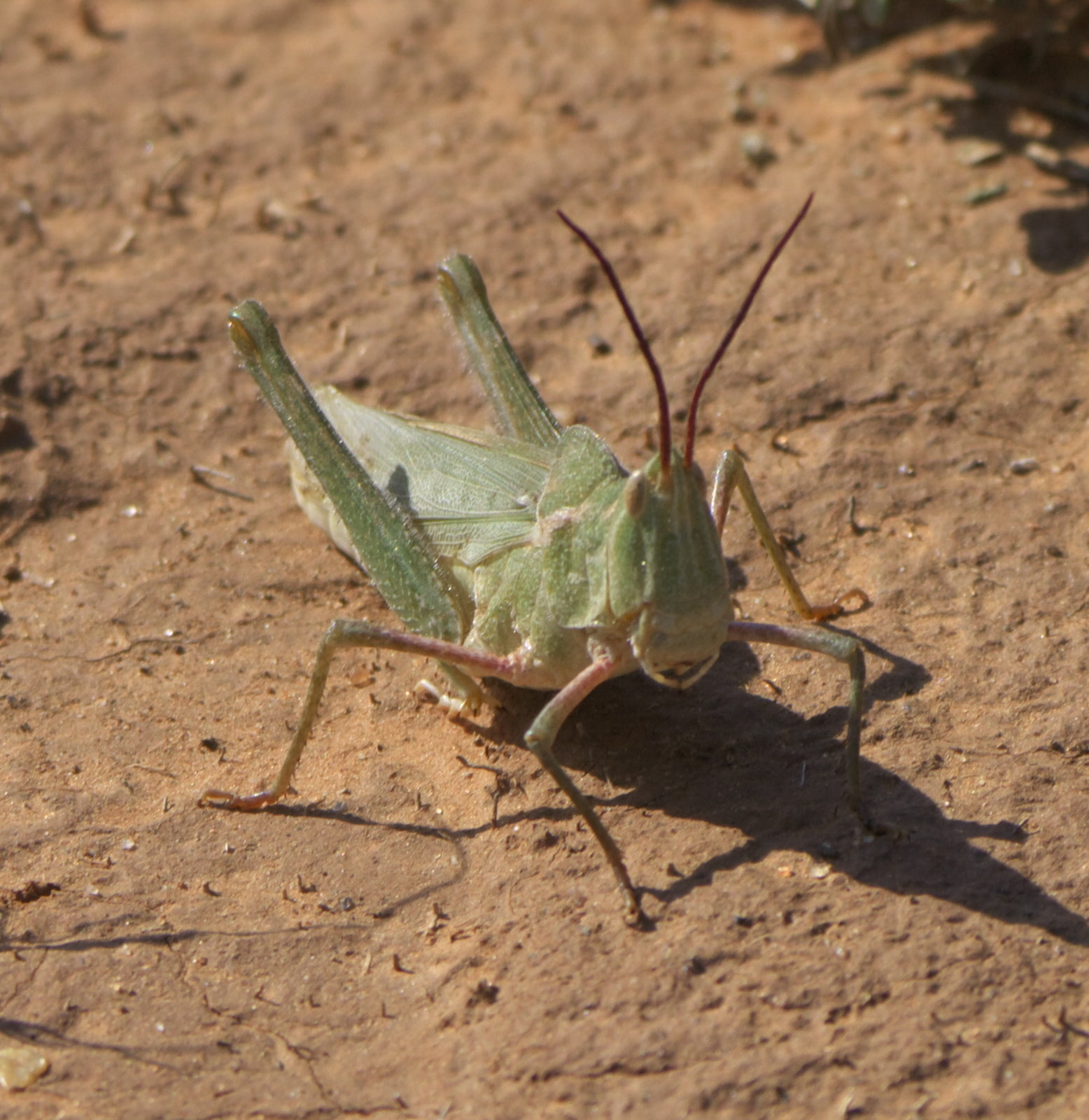
Green fool grasshopper, Acrolophitus hirtipes
