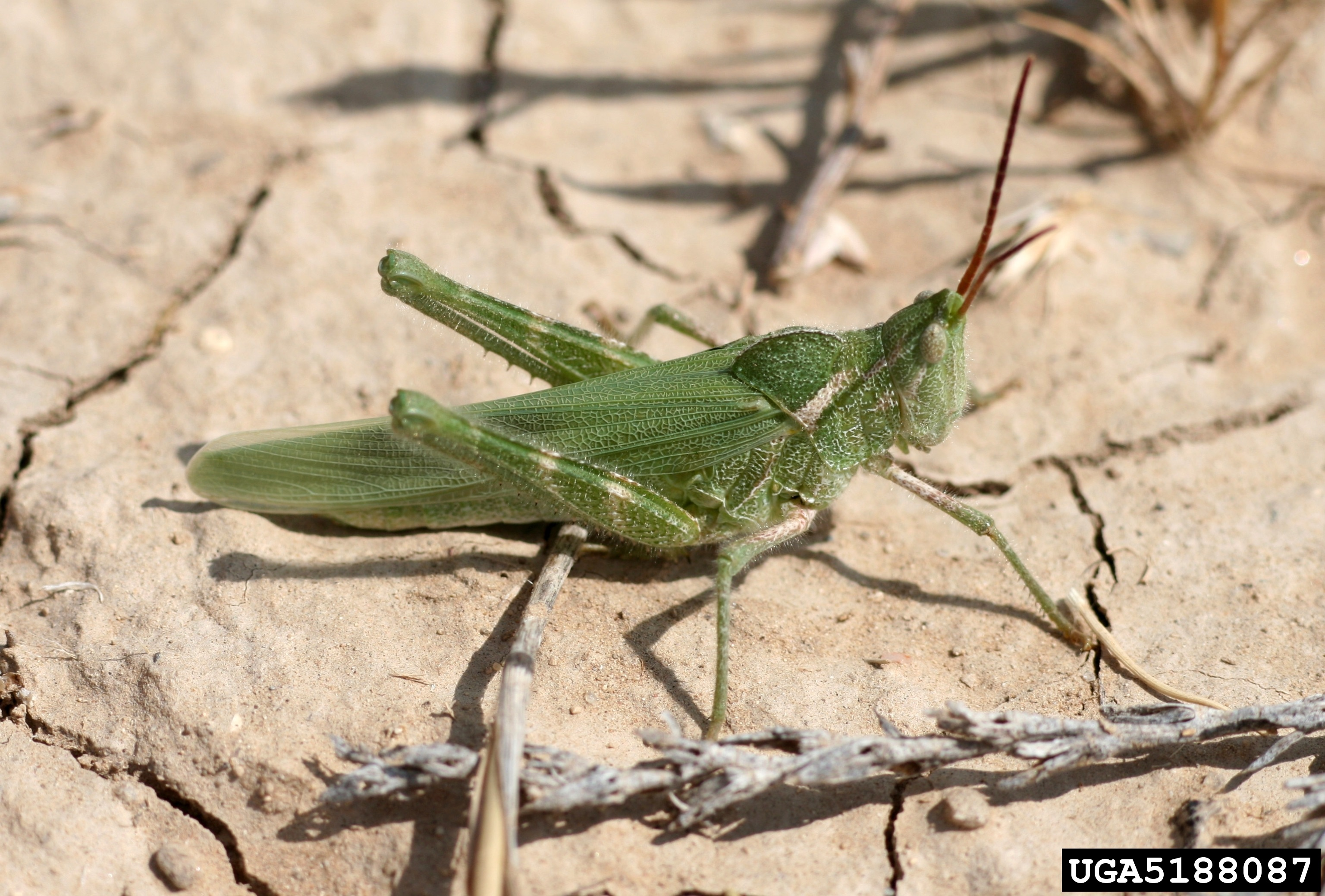
- Acrolophitus hirtipes

Scientific classification
- Domain: Eukaryota
- Kingdom: Animalia
- Phylum: Arthropoda
- Class: Insecta
- Order: Orthoptera
- Suborder: Caelifera
- Family: Acrididae
- Subfamily: Gomphocerinae
- Tribe: Acrolophitini; Scudder, 1901

Type genus
- Acrolophitus Thomas, 1871

= Acrolophitini =

Tribe of grasshoppers

Acrolophitini is a small tribe of grasshoppers within the subfamily Gomphocerinae from western North America. As of 2018, there are two genera and six species in the tribe Acrolophitini.

- Acrolophitus Thomas, 1871 (4 species)
- Bootettix Bruner, 1889 (2 species)
