= Palmodes praestans =

Scientific classification
- Domain: Eukaryota
- Kingdom: Animalia
- Phylum: Arthropoda
- Class: Insecta
- Order: Hymenoptera
- Family: Sphecidae
- Tribe: Prionychini
- Genus: Palmodes
- Species: P. praestans

Binomial name
- Palmodes praestans (Kohl, 1890)

Synonyms
- Sphex praestans Kohl, 1890

Species of wasp

Palmodes praestans is a species of thread-waisted wasp in the family Sphecidae.
