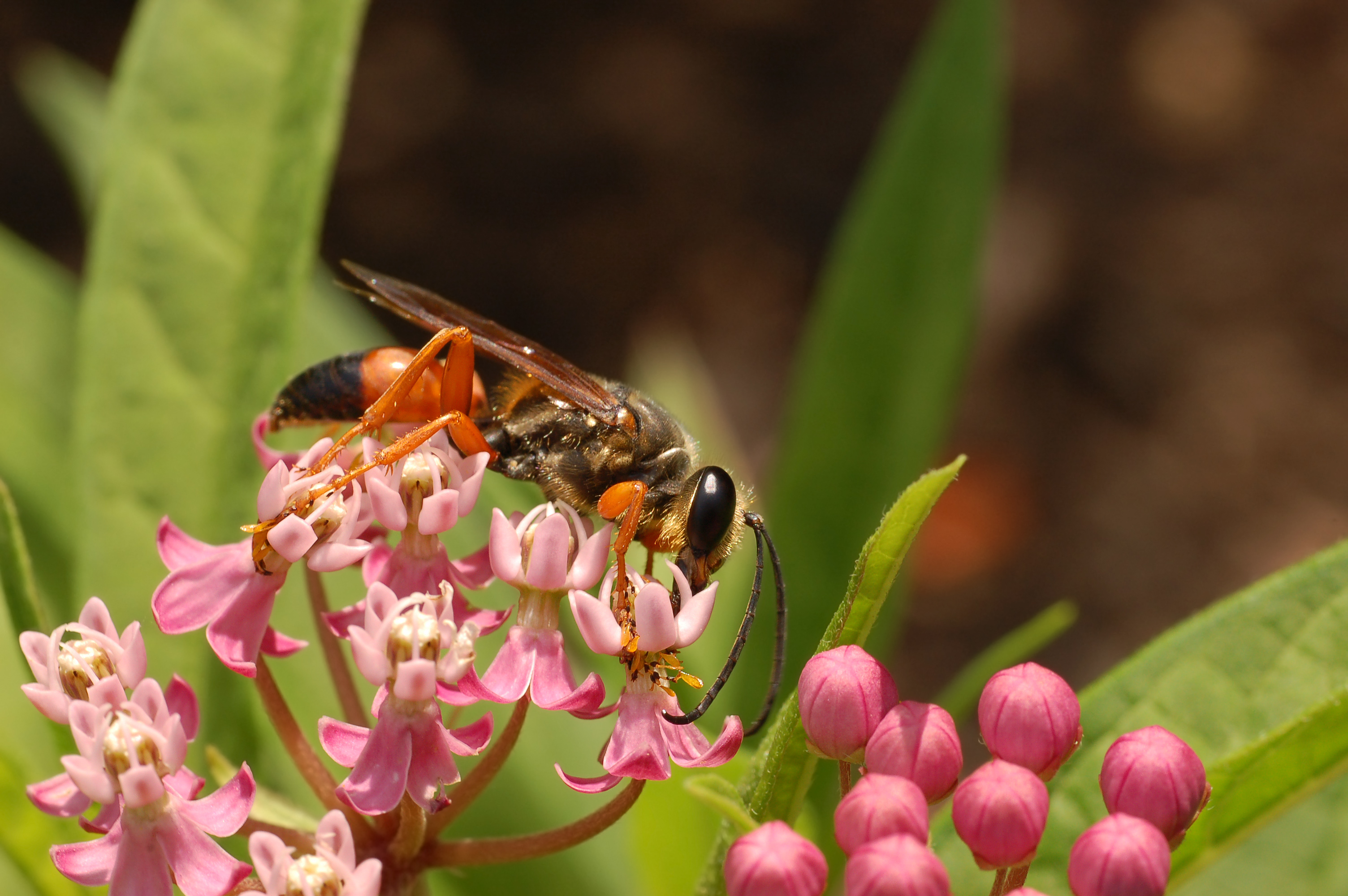
- Sphex ichneumoneus on milkweed

Scientific classification
- Kingdom: Animalia
- Phylum: Arthropoda
- Class: Insecta
- Order: Hymenoptera
- Family: Sphecidae
- Subfamily: Sphecinae

Genera
- See text

= Sphecinae =

Subfamily of insects

Sphecinae is a subfamily of the digger wasp family Sphecidae.

== Genera ==
It contains the following genera:

=== Prionychini ===
- Chilosphex Menke in R. Bohart and Menke, 1976
- Palmodes Kohl, 1890
- Prionyx Vander Linden, 1827

=== Sphecini ===
- Isodontia Patton, 1880
- Sphex Linnaeus, 1758

=== Stangeellini ===
- Stangeella Menke, 1962

== Gallery ==
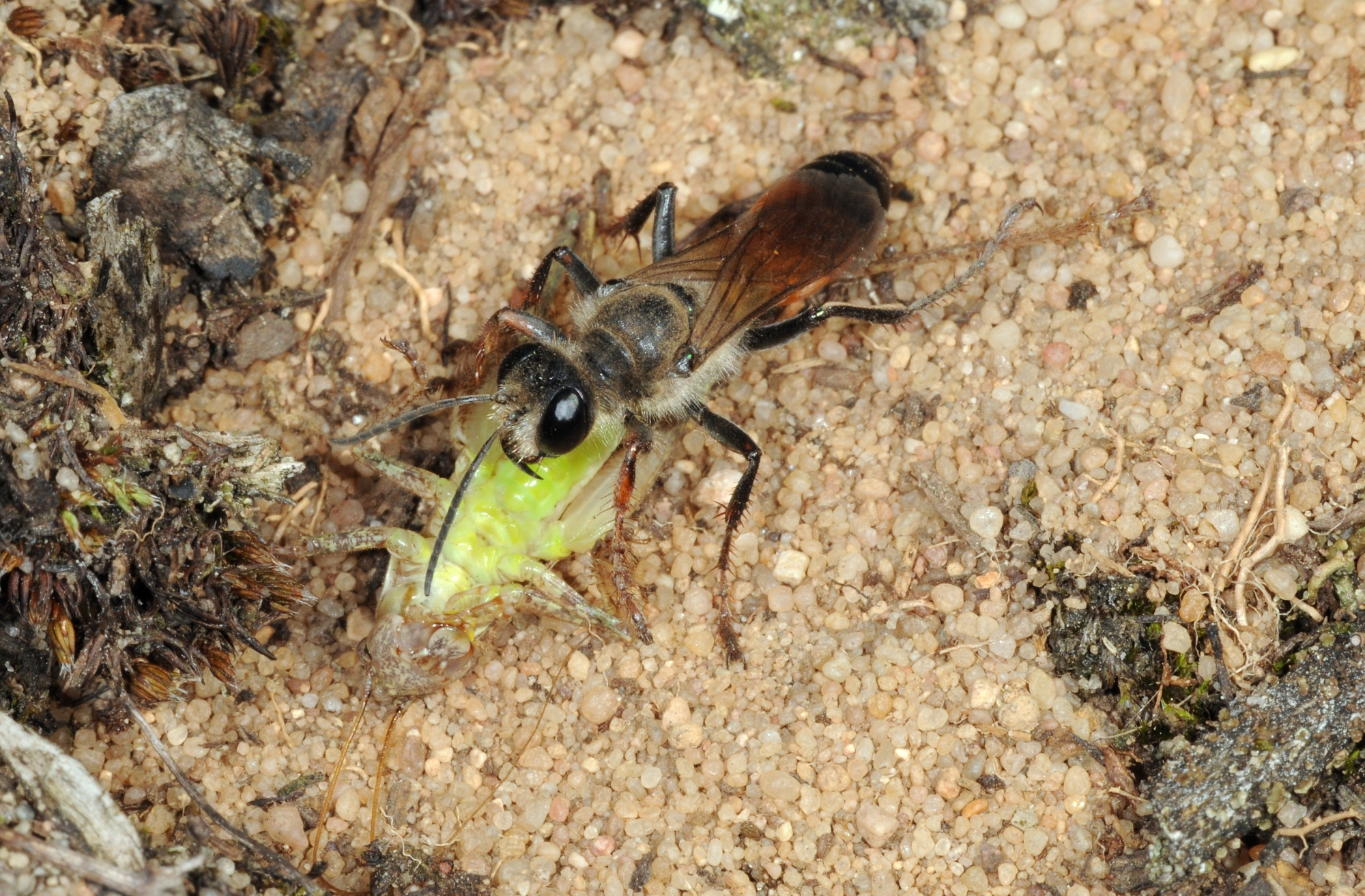
Sphex funerarius dragging prey, a bush-cricket Pholidoptera griseoaptera to provision its nest

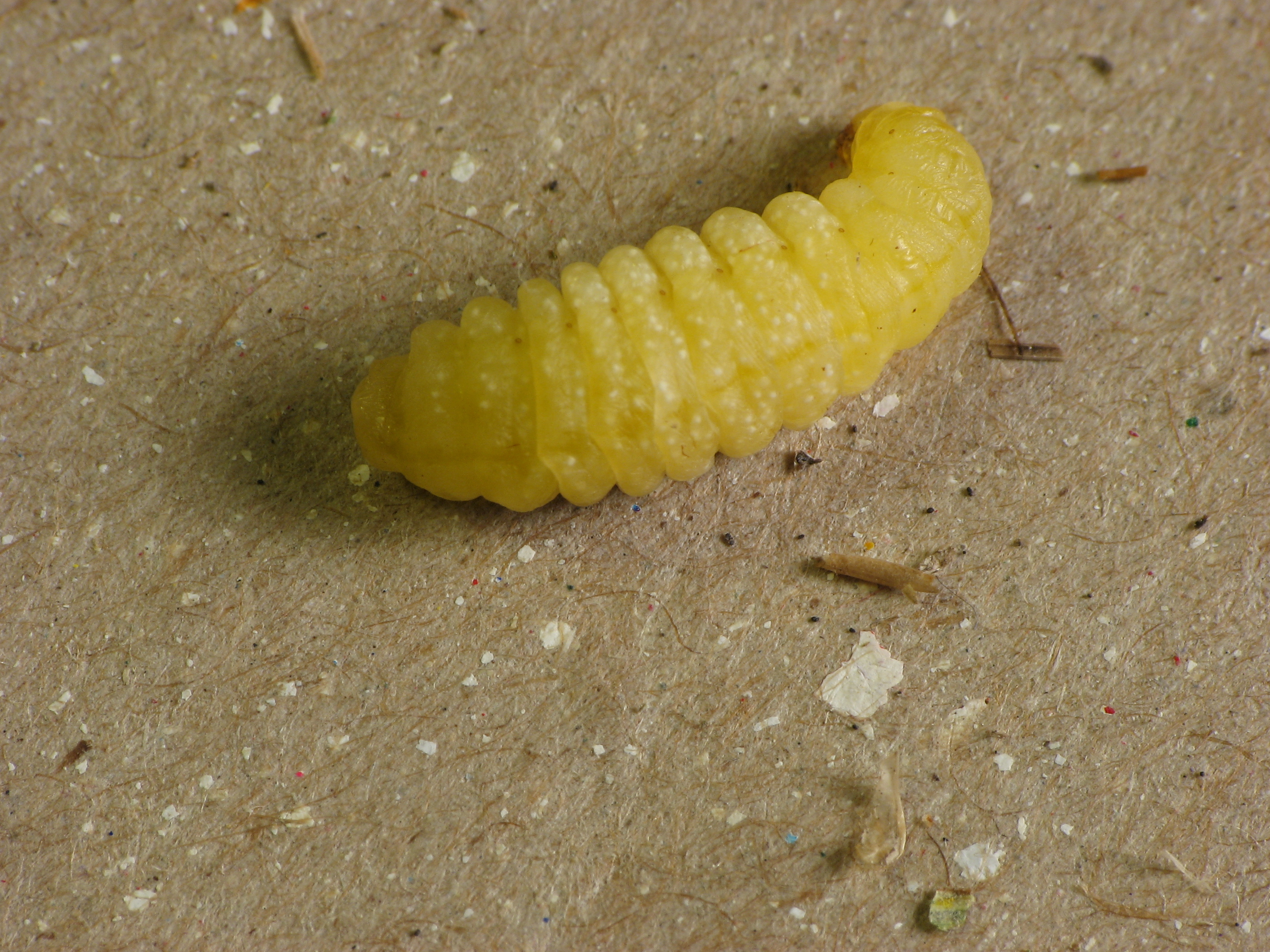
Larva of Isodontia sp. found in twig nest with katydid prey
