= CIM =

CIM or Cim may refer to:

== Businesses and organizations ==
=== Professional organizations ===
- Canadian Institute of Mining, Metallurgy and Petroleum, a professional organisation
- The Chartered Institute of Marketing, a professional organisation

=== Religious organizations ===
- Congregation of Jesus and Mary (Congregatio Iesu et Mariae), a Society of Apostolic Life in the Roman Catholic Church
- OMF International, a missionary society formerly known as China Inland Mission

=== Schools ===
- Cebu Institute of Medicine, a medical school in Cebu City, Philippines
- Cleveland Institute of Music, a school in Cleveland, Ohio

=== Transportation ===
- Chicago and Illinois Midland Railway
- Cimber Sterling, ICAO code CIM
- Uniform Rules Concerning the Contract of International Carriage of Goods by Rail, known as CIM, adopted by the Intergovernmental Organisation for International Carriage by Rail

=== Other organizations ===
- California Institution for Men, a state prison in the United States
- Comcast Interactive Media, a division of Comcast
- Inter-American Commission of Women, an international diplomatic organization
- Central Institute of Metrology of North Korea

== Places ==
- Cim, Mostar in Bosnia and Herzegovina
- Cim (archaeological site) in Bosnia and Herzegovina
- Cim, Caernarfonshire, the name of two areas near Pen-y-groes, Caernarfonshire, Wales, meaning "common land" or "shared ground"
- Čím, a municipality and village in the Czech Republic

== Science and technology ==
- Common Information Model (computing), a standard for representing elements in an IT environment
- Common Information Model (electricity), a standard for the exchange of information about an electrical network
- Computer-integrated manufacturing, the use of computers to control production processes
- Critical illness myopathy, a syndrome of diffuse muscle weakness in critically ill patients
- Customer interaction management, software for managing interactions with customers

== Other uses ==
- California International Marathon, a road race
- Certificate of Initial Mastery, an outcome-based education diploma
- Chartered Investment Manager, a designation of the Canadian Securities Institute
- CIM Group, a real estate investment firm
- Cities in Motion, a business simulation video game
- Confidential Information Memorandum, a marketing tool for the sale of business shares or assets

== See also ==
- CIMS (disambiguation)
