= Podium (disambiguation) =

A podium is a type of platform.

Podium may also refer to:

- Barbican Podium, the raised ground level and public space of the Barbican Estate
- Podium (film), a 2004 film directed by Yann Moix
- Podium (company), a US-based technology company
- Podium (wasp), a genus of wasps in the family Sphecidae
- The Podium, a shopping mall in Mandaluyong, Philippines
- The Podium (Antarctica), a bluff in the Worcester Range
- The Podium, an indoor sports venue in Spokane, Washington
- Tube feet, small multipurpose appendages in echinoderms

== See also ==
- Podium Canada
- Podium Sans
- Lectern, a stand for written materials sometimes referred to as a podium.
- Podium buildings, composed of multiple floors of wood-framed construction over a fire-resistant "podium" floor.
