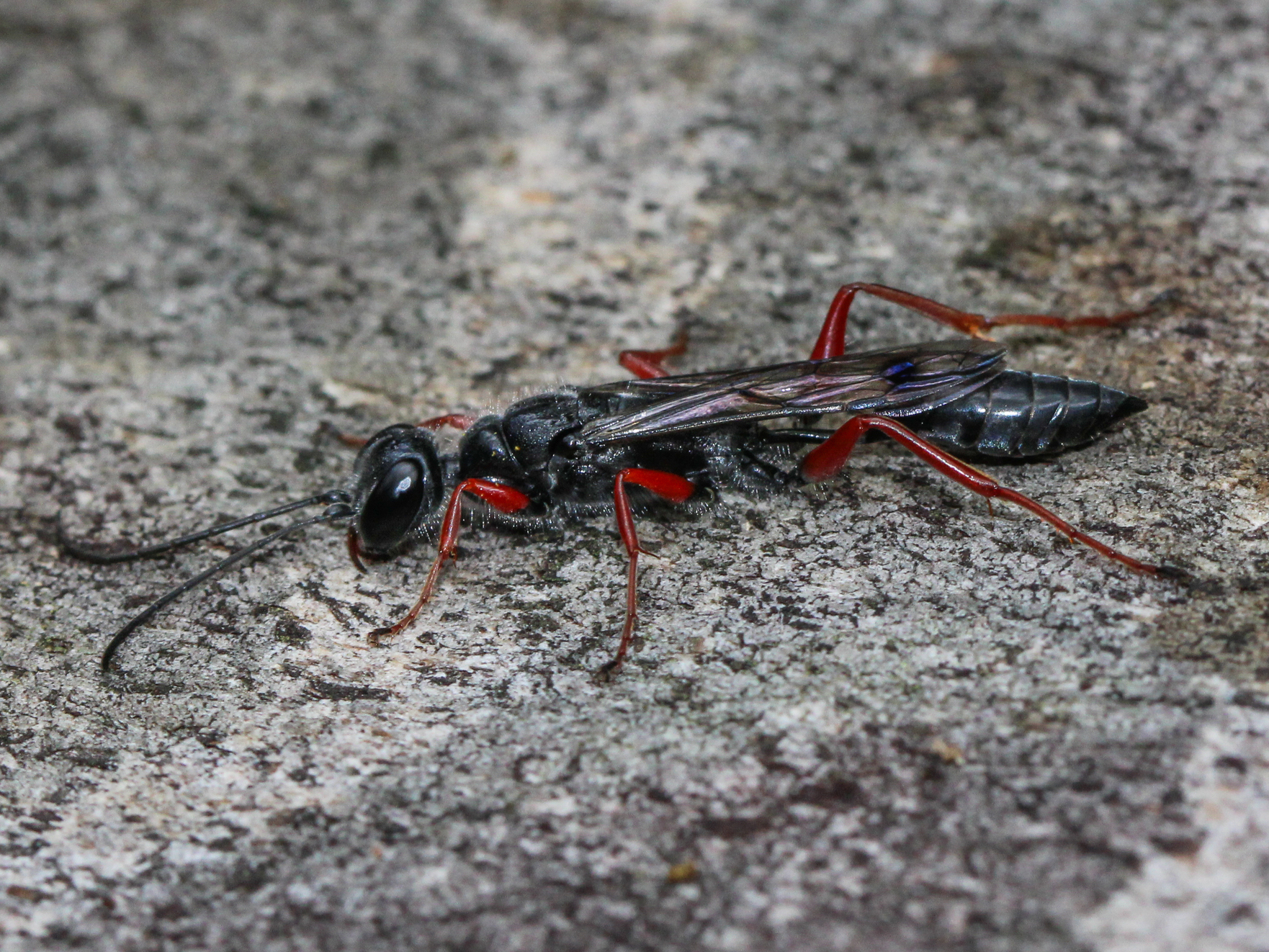

Scientific classification
- Domain: Eukaryota
- Kingdom: Animalia
- Phylum: Arthropoda
- Class: Insecta
- Order: Hymenoptera
- Family: Sphecidae
- Genus: Podium
- Species: P. rufipes

Binomial name
- Podium rufipes Fabricius, 1804

Synonyms
- Podium denticulatum Smith, 1856; Parapodium biguttatum Taschenberg, 1869; Podium carolina Rohwer, 1911

= Podium rufipes =

Species of wasp

Podium rufipes is a species of thread-waisted wasp in the family Sphecidae. It has an average length of 19 mm (0.75 in). Its body coloring is black with a tint of blue, and its legs are red with usually at least the basal fourth of the femora black. The females either repurpose an abandoned nest, including that of Sceliphron and wood-boring beetles, or builds a trap nest in wood. Their young are provisioned with paralyzed cockroach nymphs.
