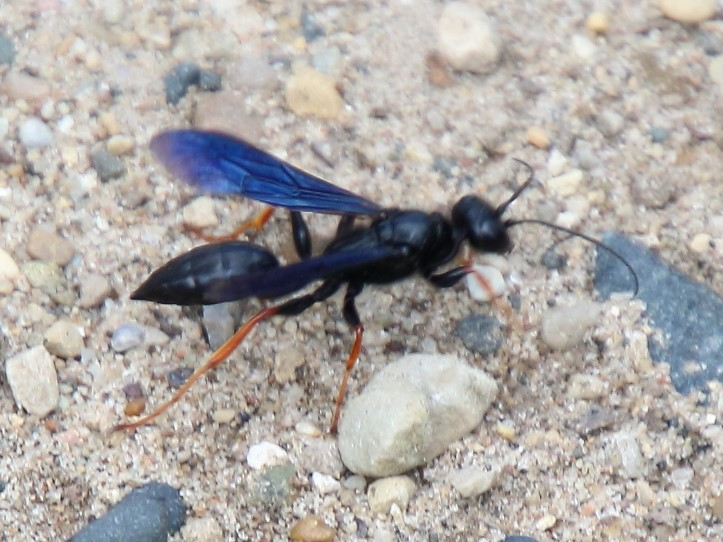

Scientific classification
- Domain: Eukaryota
- Kingdom: Animalia
- Phylum: Arthropoda
- Class: Insecta
- Order: Hymenoptera
- Family: Sphecidae
- Tribe: Podiini
- Genus: Podium
- Species: P. luctuosum

Binomial name
- Podium luctuosum F. Smith, 1856

= Podium luctuosum =

Species of wasp

Podium luctuosum is a species of thread-waisted wasp in the family Sphecidae. It is known to provide Parcoblatta as prey for its larvae.
