= CIMS =

CIMS is an acronym. It may refer to:

- CIMS-FM, a French-language Canadian radio station
- Coordinated Incident Management System, New Zealand's system for coordinating its emergency services
- Courant Institute of Mathematical Sciences, a research division of New York University
- Content Management Interoperability Services, a standards proposal for sharing information among disparate content repositories
- Carleton Immersive Media Studio, a research centre at Carleton University, Ottawa, Canada
- Care Institute of Medical Sciences, Ahmedabad, a multi-speciality hospital in Gujarat, India
- Chhattisgarh Institute of Medical Sciences, a medical college in city of Bilaspur, Chhattisgarh, India
