= Rideau Street Chapel =

Church in Ottawa, Ontario, Canada

Coordinates: 45.429434°N 75.698386°W

Rideau Street Chapel of the Convent of Our Lady of the Sacred Heart Ottawa, Ontario
- Rideau Street Chapel of the Convent of Our Lady of the Sacred Heart Ottawa, Ontario
- Denomination: Roman Catholic

The Rideau Street Convent Chapel was a Gothic Revival chapel that formed part of the Convent of Our Lady of the Sacred Heart on Rideau Street in Ottawa, Ontario, Canada. Designed by Georges Bouillon in 1887–88, it was dismantled in 1972 and rebuilt inside the National Gallery of Canada in order to preserve its unique architecture.

== History ==
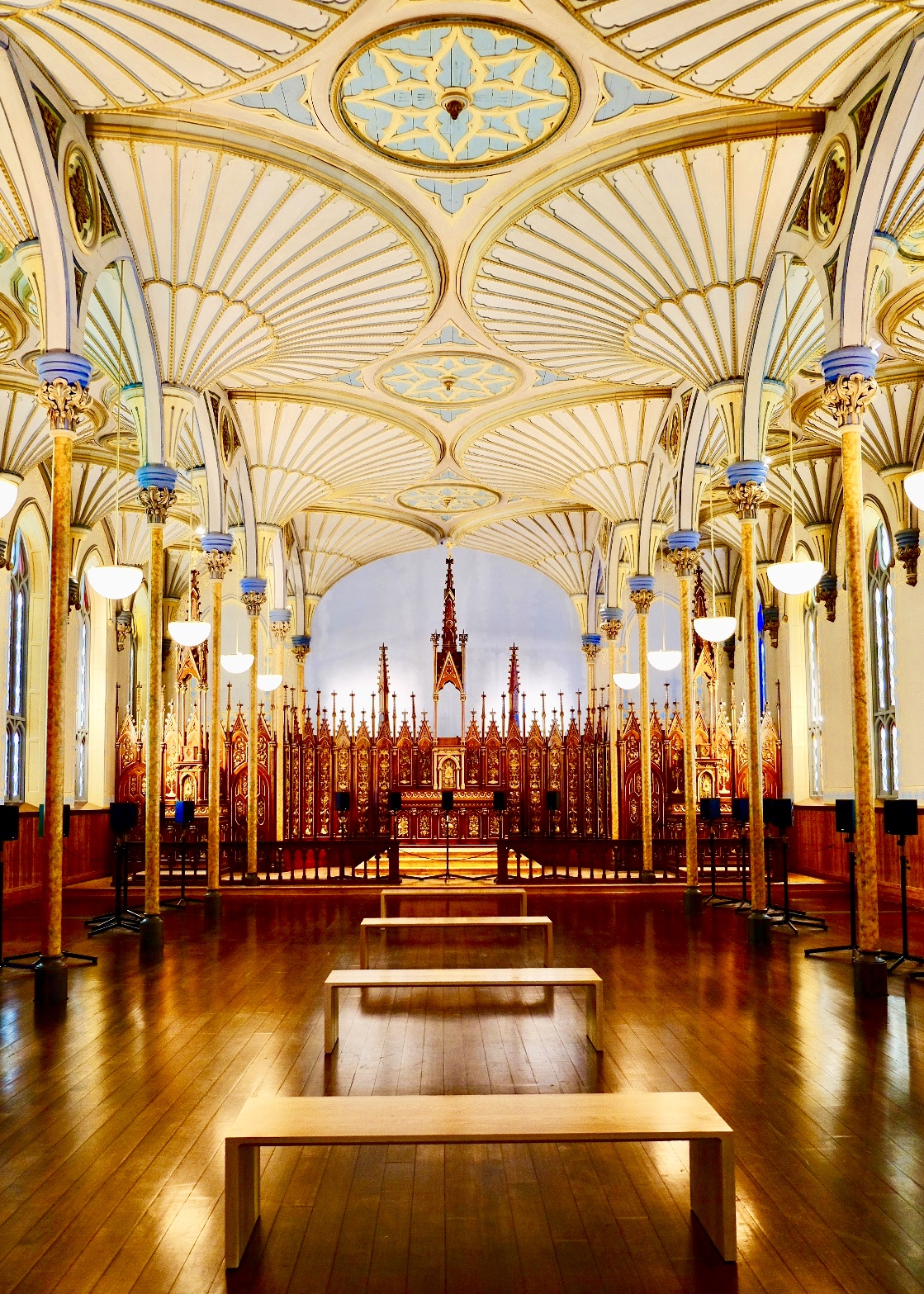
Rideau Street Chapel rebuilt at the National Gallery of Canada

The Convent of Our Lady of the Sacred Heart (also known as the Rideau Street Convent) was built in 1869. In 1888, a new wing designed by the architect and priest Georges Bouillon opened that included the Rideau Street Convent Chapel on the second floor. The plan of the Gothic Revival chapel was traditional, with a nave and two side aisles lit by stained-glass windows. Its unique feature was a ceiling overspread with decorative fan vaulting supported on slender cast iron columns, creating an effect of spacious elegance. There was also an elaborate carved wood altar screen.

Although the convent was demolished in 1972, the chapel`s interior was salvaged as the result of a public appeal to preserve its architectural beauty. The interior was reconstructed inside the National Gallery of Canada in Ottawa, a process that took four years. Its careful preservation gives visitors the impression that they are actually entering the chapel as it was before it was demolished. Its stained glass windows are illuminated with artificial lighting, giving the illusion of outside sunlight, as the chapel is located in the interior of the National Gallery without direct access to natural light.

The chapel often showcases Janet Cardiff's exhibit Forty-Part Motet (2001), which features the melody "Spem in alium" by Thomas Tallis. Each of the forty speakers set around the chapel plays the sound of a single voice of the forty-part choir.

In 2004, a Carleton University research centre, Carleton Immersive Media Studio (CIMS) undertook the project of digitizing both the exterior and interior of the chapel. Supported by a Canadian Heritage New Media Research Network Fund grant, the digitization process used architectural drawings as well as the chapel's actual built dimensions to ensure accuracy. The 3D modeling software Maya was used to construct the interior space of the chapel. Since the Convent exterior was not saved, archival photographs of its exterior were used to rebuild the geometry of the building by means of photogrammetry, a method that generates 3D geometry from two or more photographs of the same object taken from different angles. In addition, laser scanning was done on the intricate woodwork of the chapel’s altarpieces and carvings to produce detailed renderings of those elements.
