= Cim, Mostar =

Suburb in Mostar, Bosnia and Herzegovina

Cim
- Suburb
- Location within Bosnia and Herzegovina
- Coordinates: 43°21′10″N 17°46′38″E
- Country: Bosnia and Herzegovina
- Entity: Federation of Bosnia and Herzegovina
- Canton: Herzegovina-Neretva
- Municipality: Mostar

Area
  - Total: 0.97 sq mi (2.50 km^{2})

Population (2013)
  - Total: 3,061
  - Density: 3,170/sq mi (1,220/km^{2})
- Time zone: UTC+1 (CET)
  - Summer (DST): UTC+2 (CEST)

Cim is a suburban neighborhood of Mostar, Bosnia and Herzegovina. Its population in 2013 was 3,061.

== Demographics ==
According to the 2013 census, its population was 3,061.

Ethnicity in 2013
Ethnicity	Number	Percentage
Croats	3,013	98.4%
Bosniaks	11	0.4%
Serbs	6	0.2%
other/undeclared	31	1.0%
Total	3,061	100%

== See also ==
- Cim (archaeological site)
