= Podium (company) =

American software company

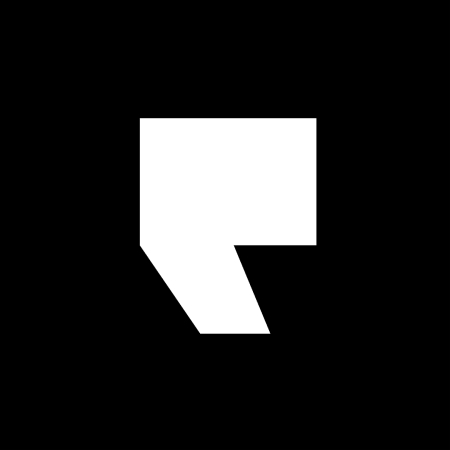
- Company type: Private
- Industry: Software
- Founded: 2014
- Headquarters: Lehi, Utah, United States
- Key people: Eric Rea, Co-Founder, Dennis Steele, Co-Founder
- Products: Online Reputation Management, Customer interaction management, Customer Relationship Management, Contactless Payments
- Revenue: ▲$100 Million(2019)
- Number of employees: 1,300
- Website: https://www.podium.com

Podium is a private technology company headquartered in Lehi, Utah that develops cloud-based software related to messaging, customer feedback, online reviews, selling products, and requesting payments.

== History ==
Podium was founded in 2014 by Eric Rea and Dennis Steele, who developed a tool to help small businesses "build their online reputation" through online reviews. Podium was initially known as RepDrive before rebranding as Podium in 2015. In 2015, Podium moved from a spare bedroom to a new location above a Provo bike shop. In March 2020, Podium added payments technology to its product suite. In November 2021, Podium raised $201 million in Series D funding and was valued at $3 billion.

== Product ==
Podium is a software-as-a-service platform designed to improve business online reputation. It helps users manage business interactions in one tool. Users can communicate reviews, texts, chats, and post payment directly within the app.
