= Čím =

- Municipality
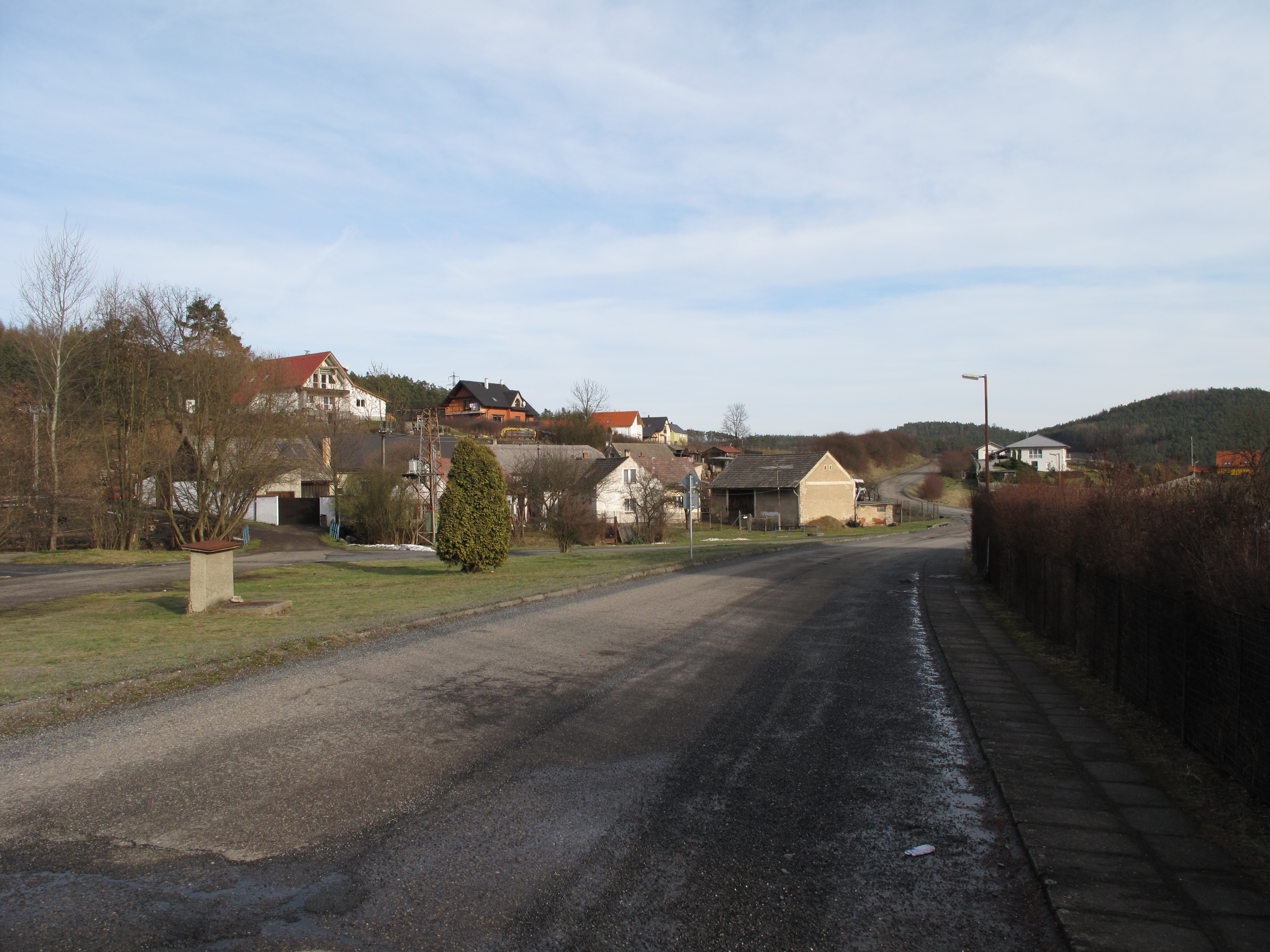
- Centre of Čím

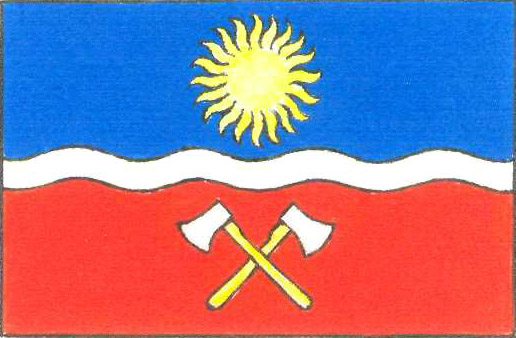
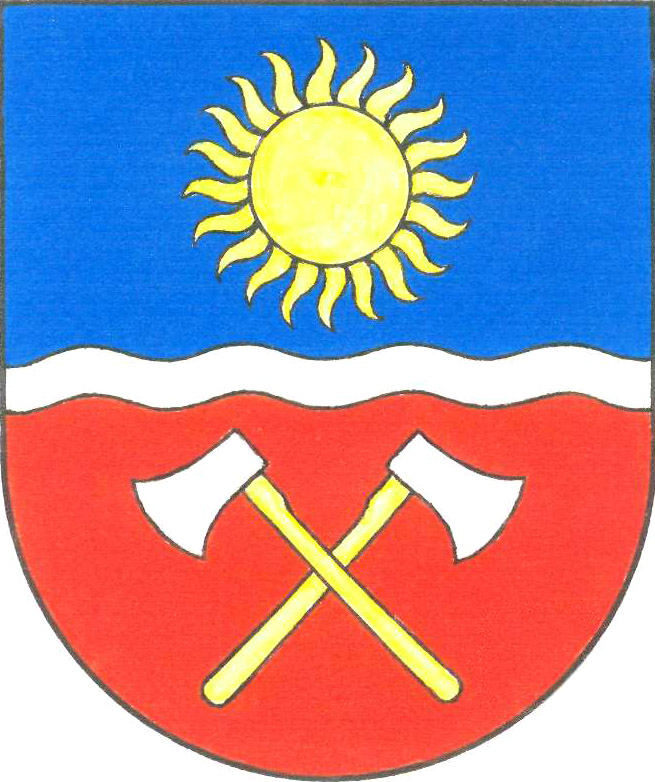
- Flag Coat of arms

- Location in the Czech Republic
- Coordinates: 49°46′43″N 14°22′40″E
- Country: Czech Republic
- Region: Central Bohemian
- District: Příbram
- First mentioned: 1316

Area
  - Total: 6.19 km^{2} (2.39 sq mi)
- Elevation: 320 m (1,050 ft)

Population (2026-01-01)
  - Total: 405
  - Density: 65.4/km^{2} (169/sq mi)
- Time zone: UTC+1 (CET)
  - Summer (DST): UTC+2 (CEST)
- Postal code: 262 03
- Website: www.cim-obec.cz

Čím is a municipality and village in Příbram District in the Central Bohemian Region of the Czech Republic. It has about 400 inhabitants.

== Etymology ==
The initial name of the settlement was Čámy. It was derived from the personal name Čám, meaning "Čám's (court)".

== Geography ==
Čím is located about 28 kilometres (17 mi) northeast of Příbram and 28 km (17 mi) south of Prague. It lies in the Benešov Uplands. The highest point is near the top of the Besedná hill at 493 m (1,617 ft) above sea level. The municipality is situated on the left shore of the Slapy Reservoir, built on the Vltava River.

== History ==
The first written mention of Čím is from 1316. In the mid-14th century, the village was divided into several parts, which had different owners. One of the parts was owned by the local noble Čámský family.

== Demographics ==
Historical population

Year	Pop.	±%
1869	434	—
1880	461	+6.2%
1890	447	−3.0%
1900	412	−7.8%
1910	411	−0.2%

Year	Pop.	±%
1921	367	−10.7%
1930	340	−7.4%
1950	235	−30.9%
1961	253	+7.7%
1970	234	−7.5%

Year	Pop.	±%
1980	235	+0.4%
1991	221	−6.0%
2001	215	−2.7%
2011	311	+44.7%
2021	387	+24.4%

Source: Censuses

== Transport ==
There are no railways or major roads passing through the municipality.

== Sights ==
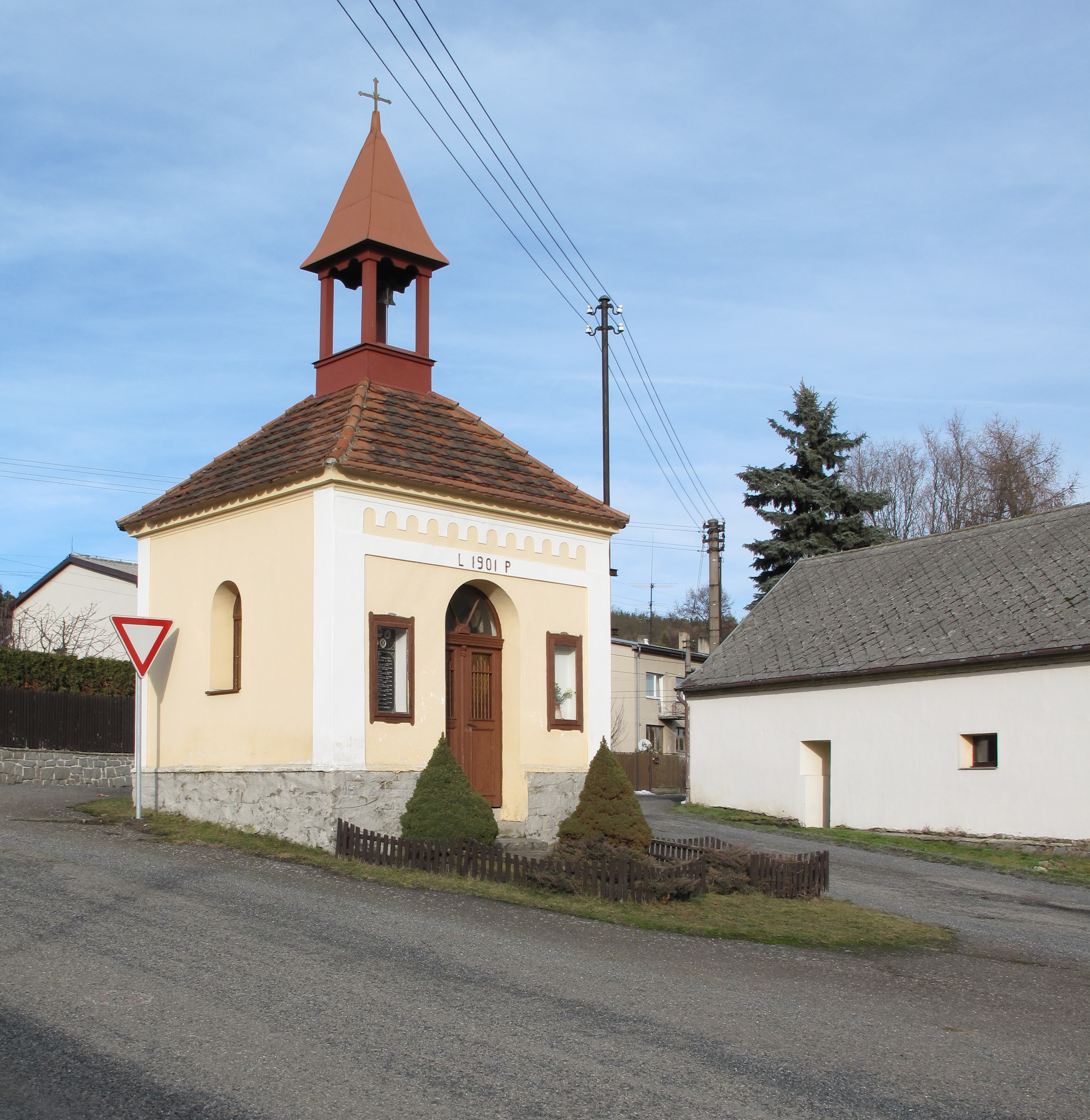
Chapel of Saint Vitus

There are no protected cultural monuments in the municipality. A landmark of the centre of Čím is the Chapel of Saint Vitus.
