= Carleton Immersive Media Studio =

Academic unit within Carleton University

Established in 2002, Carleton Immersive Media Studio (CIMS) is a Carleton University Research Centre within the School of Architecture. The CIMS research agenda is based on the intertwining of content creation and applied research, allowing each to affect and inform the other. With a twofold aim of building upon existing and burgeoning Canadian digital media and technology and being situated alongside Canada's social and cultural commitment, CIMS research projects privilege content and user-driven research that is enabled by technology.

== Research Projects ==
=== Rideau Chapel ===
In the program Digital Architecture Reconstruction Program 1.0 (DARP), CIMS re-visited the site of the Convent of Our Lady of the Sacred Heart site in Ottawa, Ontario, Canada, a building demolished in 1972, in order to resurrect a story with intertwining points of view of historical preservation, community activism and the role of digital documentation. The interior of the Rideau Street Chapel was digitally reconstructed by CIMS using various diverse technologies such as laser scanning, photogrammetry and 3D modeling.

=== Boulevard St. Laurent ===
In a second Canadian Heritage funded project (DARP 2.0) the existing condition under investigation was the urban area of lower Boulevard St. Laurent in Montreal, Quebec, Canada. As this area is currently undergoing urban and commercial redevelopment, this project served both to document a pivotal time in its history and the potential to project a future of the site that is of interest to city officials, personal stakeholders and the community alike.

=== Salk Institute ===
CIMS also undertook the digital reconstruction of the Salk Institute in La Jolla, California as part of a real-time demonstration in collaboration with the National Research Council Canada, Communications Research Centre Canada and CANARIE at iGrid 2005. In efforts to showcase the 10Gb User Controlled Light Path, the model of building was used to assess and confirm digital content production processes and the exchange of large data sets in real-time over long distances. Documentation of existing conditions of the Salk Institute was used to enhance and make more accurate the original model built in Ottawa.

=== Eucalyptus ===
Technologies concerning virtual classroom-type scenarios are not a new invention. However, the onset of intelligent network infrastructure and user controlled lightpaths is. This CANARIE funded research program is in partnership with the Communications Research Centre of Canada (CRC) and the National Research Council, Broadband Visual Communication research group (NRC-BVC). It intends to develop the tools necessary to allow architects and designers at multiple locations to collaborate in real-time by sharing computational resources, geometry datasets and multimedia content utilizing the UCLP on CA*net4 and Service Oriented Architecture that allows simultaneous shared access to visualization, modeling, and visual communication tools.
