= Cim, Caernarfonshire =

Two areas in Wales

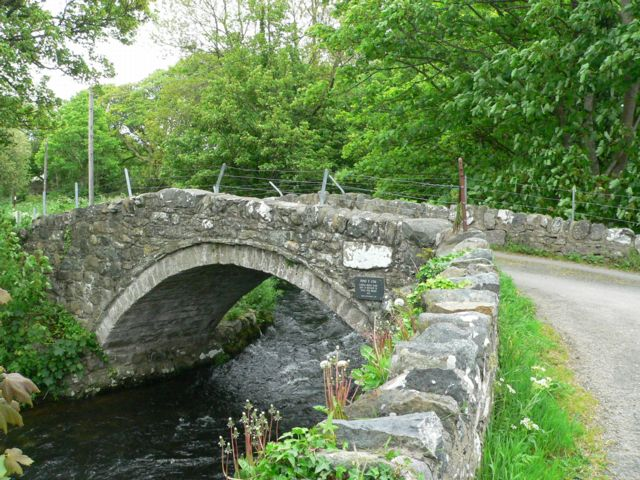
Pont-y-Cim Bridge built in 1612

Cim or Y Cim is the name of two relatively small areas of two Caernarfonshire communities in Gwynedd, north Wales. The name means "common land" or "land shared between local inhabitants". Cim in Llandwrog parish is still an unenclosed area of waste and marshy ground, while Cim in Llanllyfni parish has been absorbed into local farms. A local bridge, built in 1612 and still standing, is known as "Pont y Cim". The same place-name element is to be found elsewhere in Wales: for example Cimla, Y Cimdda (Commonland near Llantrisant, (both in the old county of Glamorgan) and Coed y Cymdda on the outskirts of Cardiff.
