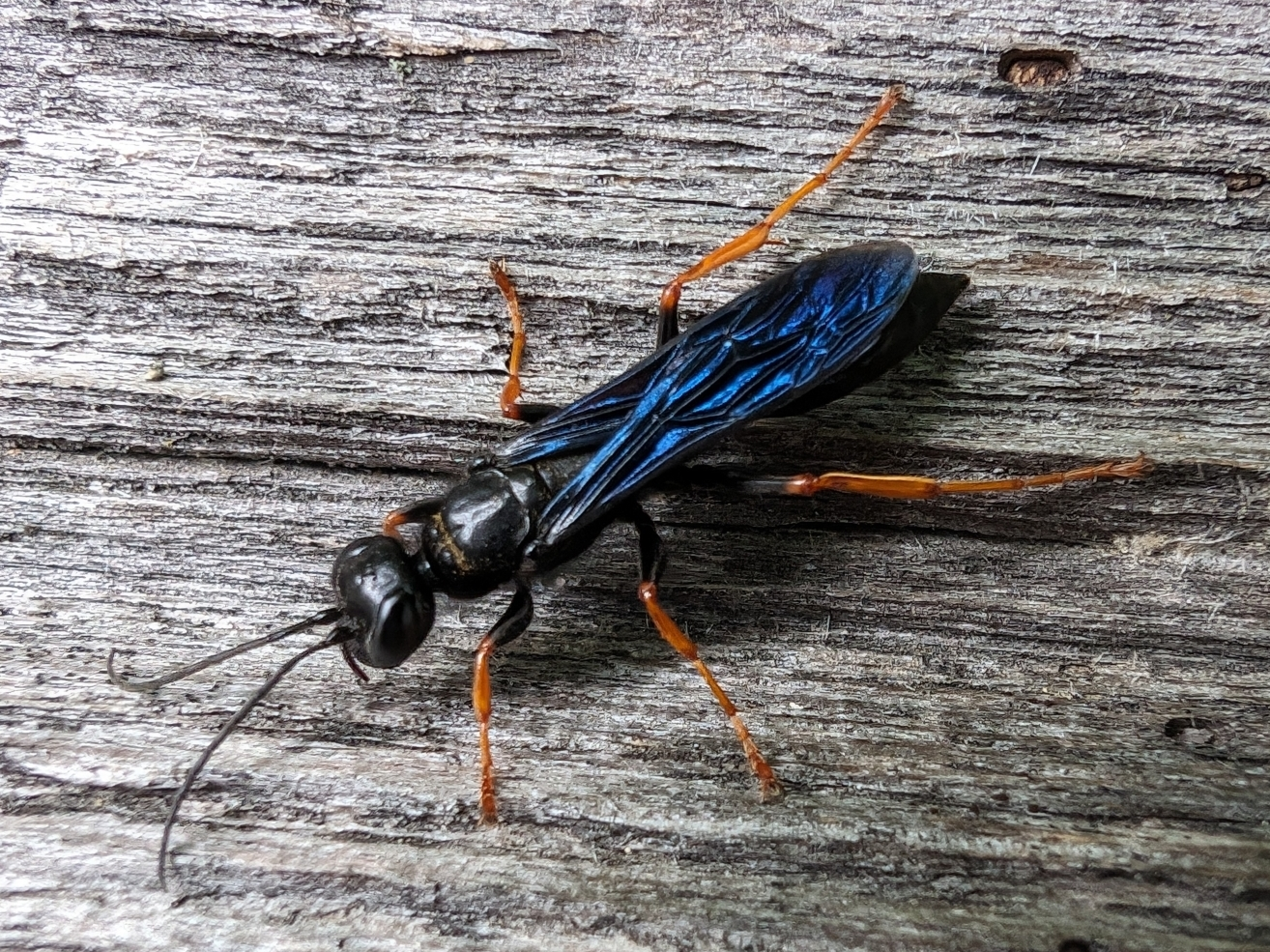
- Podium luctuosum in Illinois

Scientific classification
- Kingdom: Animalia
- Phylum: Arthropoda
- Clade: Pancrustacea
- Class: Insecta
- Order: Hymenoptera
- Family: Sphecidae
- Subfamily: Sceliphrinae
- Tribe: Podiini
- Genus: Podium; Fabricius, 1804

Synonyms
- Talthybius Rafinesque-Schmaltz, 1815; Ammophilus Perty, 1833; Parapodium Taschenberg, 1869

= Podium (wasp) =

Genus of wasps

Podium is a genus of thread-waisted wasps in the family Sphecidae. They hunt cockroaches as provisions for their larvae.

== Description and identification ==
Podium have an elongate petiole typical of thread-waisted wasps. As cockroach-hunting wasps, their bodies are flattened and elongate, a trait homoplastically shared with the Ampulicidae.

== Distribution and habitat ==
Podium is primarily a neotropical genus apart from 3 species that occur in the United States.

== Behavior ==
Much like Chalybion, female Podium either repurpose abandoned mud nests, nest in pre-existing cavities, or built trap nests in plants such as bamboo. In species that build nests with multiple cells, the dividing walls are constructed out of mud. The female hunts cockroaches, which she stings and paralyzes, to provision these cells. She lays an egg between the fore coxae of one of the provisioned cockroaches either before or after placing in the cell. Afterward, the female seals the cell with mud. In multicellular nests, additional cells are built in the same manner. Once the final cell of the nest is completed, she constructs a nest plug out of mud.

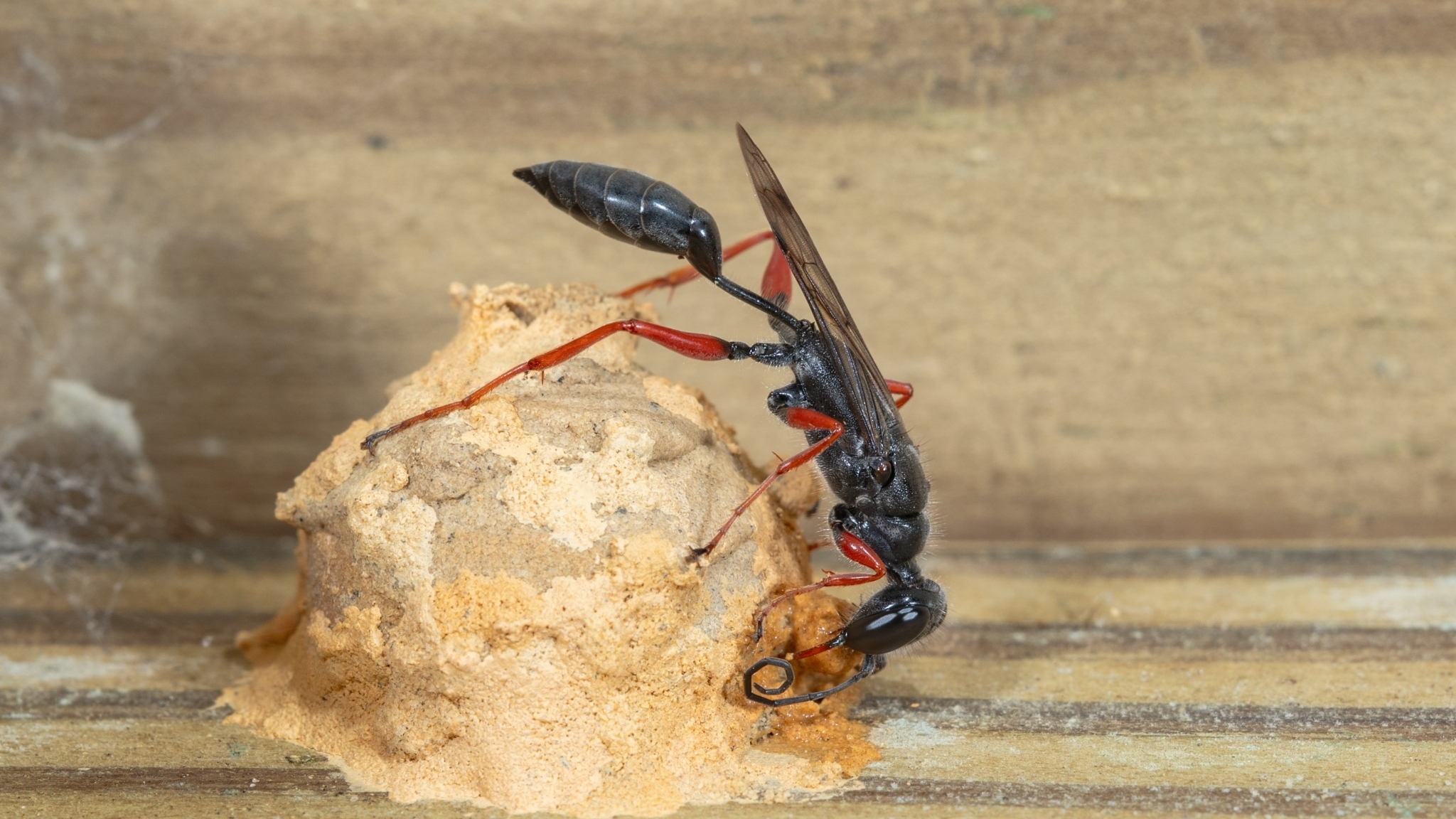
Podium rufipes repurposing a mud nest

== Species ==
There are 23 species in the genus Podium:

=== Podium agile species-group ===
- Podium agile Kohl, 1902
- Podium friesei Kohl, 1902
- Podium plesiosaurus (F. Smith, 1873)
- Podium trigonopsoides Menke, 1974

=== Podium eurycephalum species-group ===
- Podium eurycephalum Ohl, 1996

=== Podium fumigatum species-group ===
- Podium angustifrons Kohl, 1902
- Podium aureosericeum Kohl, 1902
- Podium bugabense Cameron, 1888
- Podium chalybaeum Kohl, 1902
- Podium denticulatum F. Smith, 1856
- Podium foxii Kohl, 1902
- Podium fulvipes Cresson, 1865
- Podium fumigatum (Perty, 1833)
- Podium intermissum Kohl, 1902
- Podium iridescens Kohl, 1902
- Podium luctuosum F. Smith, 1856
- Podium opalinum F. Smith, 1856
- Podium sexdentatum Taschenberg, 1869
- Podium tau (Dalla Torre, 1897)

=== Podium rufipes species-group ===
- Podium rufipes Fabricius, 1804
- Podium batesianum W. Schulz, 1904
- Podium kohlii Zavattari, 1908
- Podium krombeini Bohart and Menke, 1963

== Gallery ==
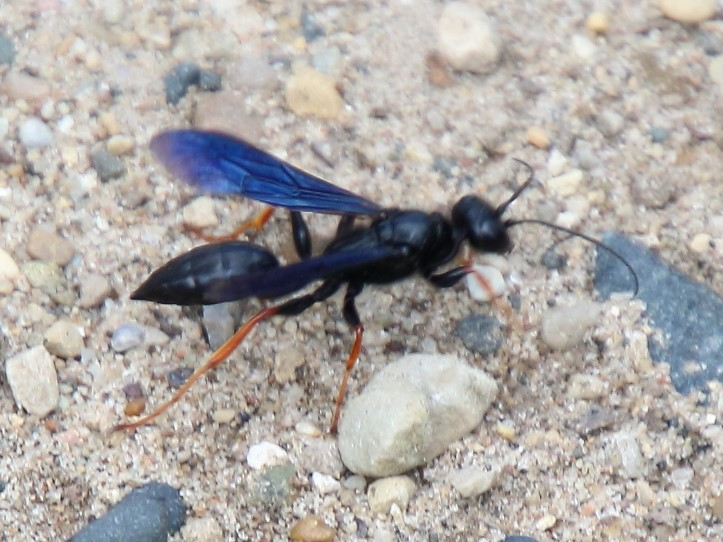
Podium luctuosum in Illinois.

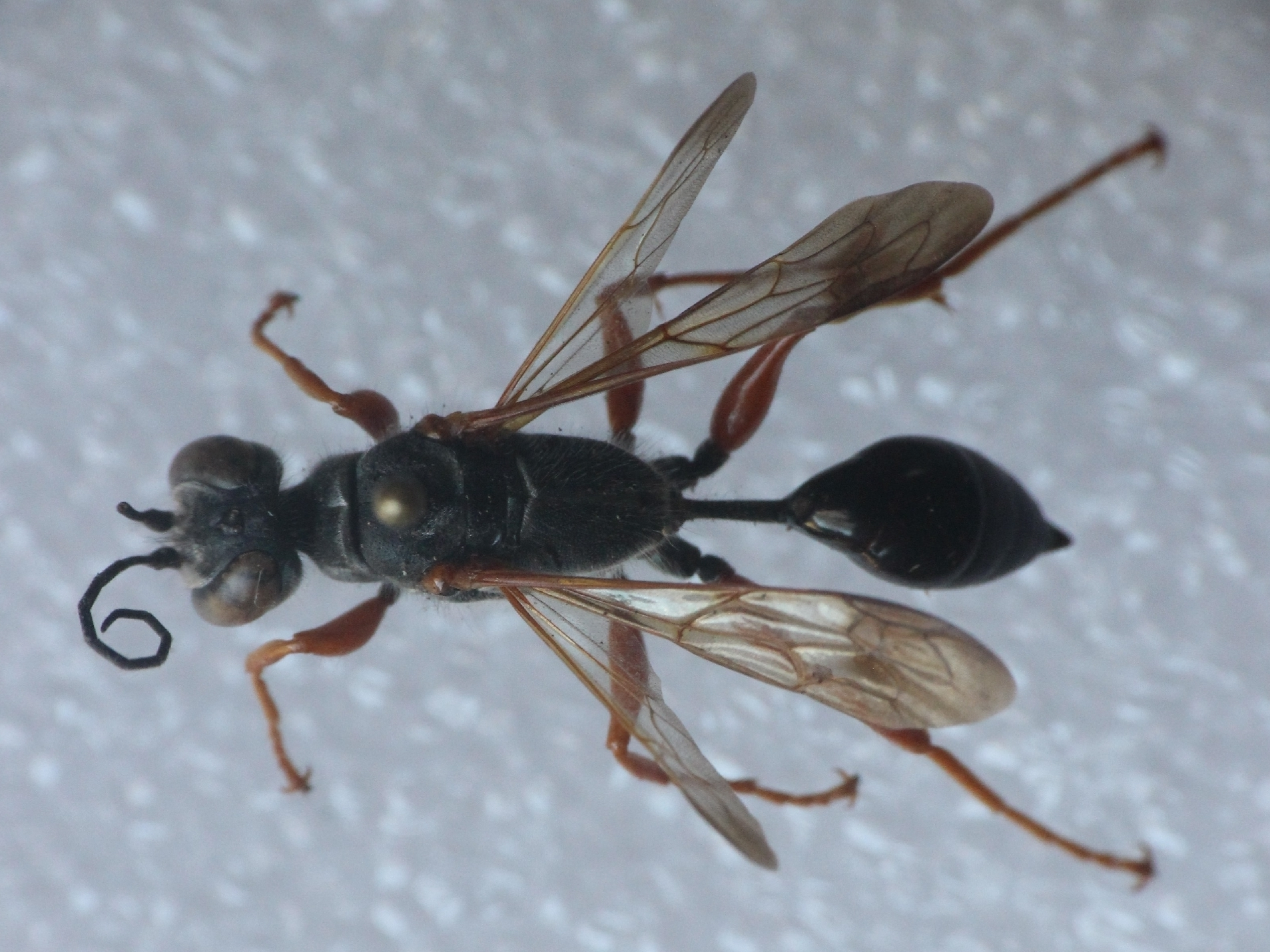
Podium fulvipes specimen from Cuba.

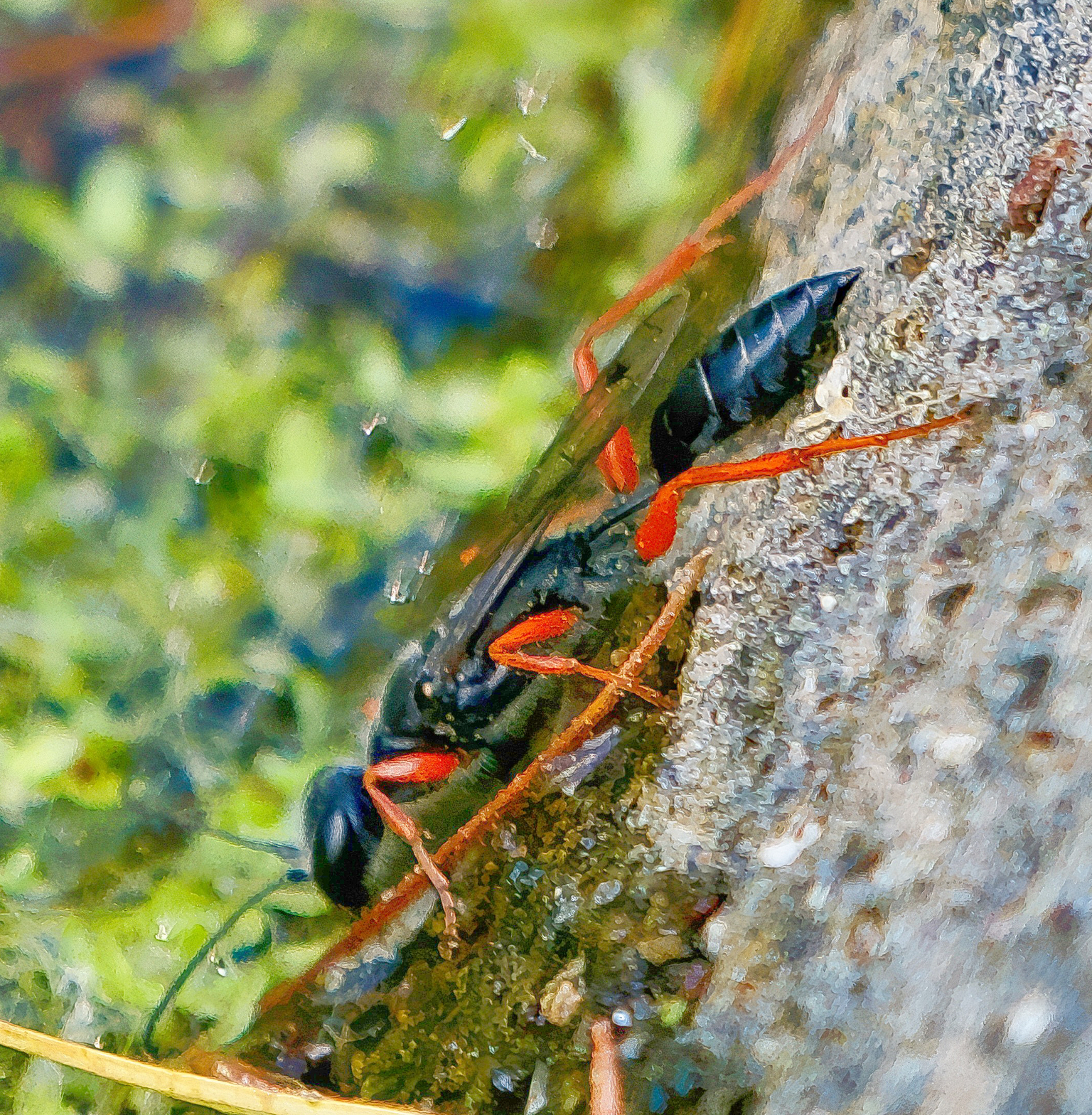
Podium krombeini in Baja California.

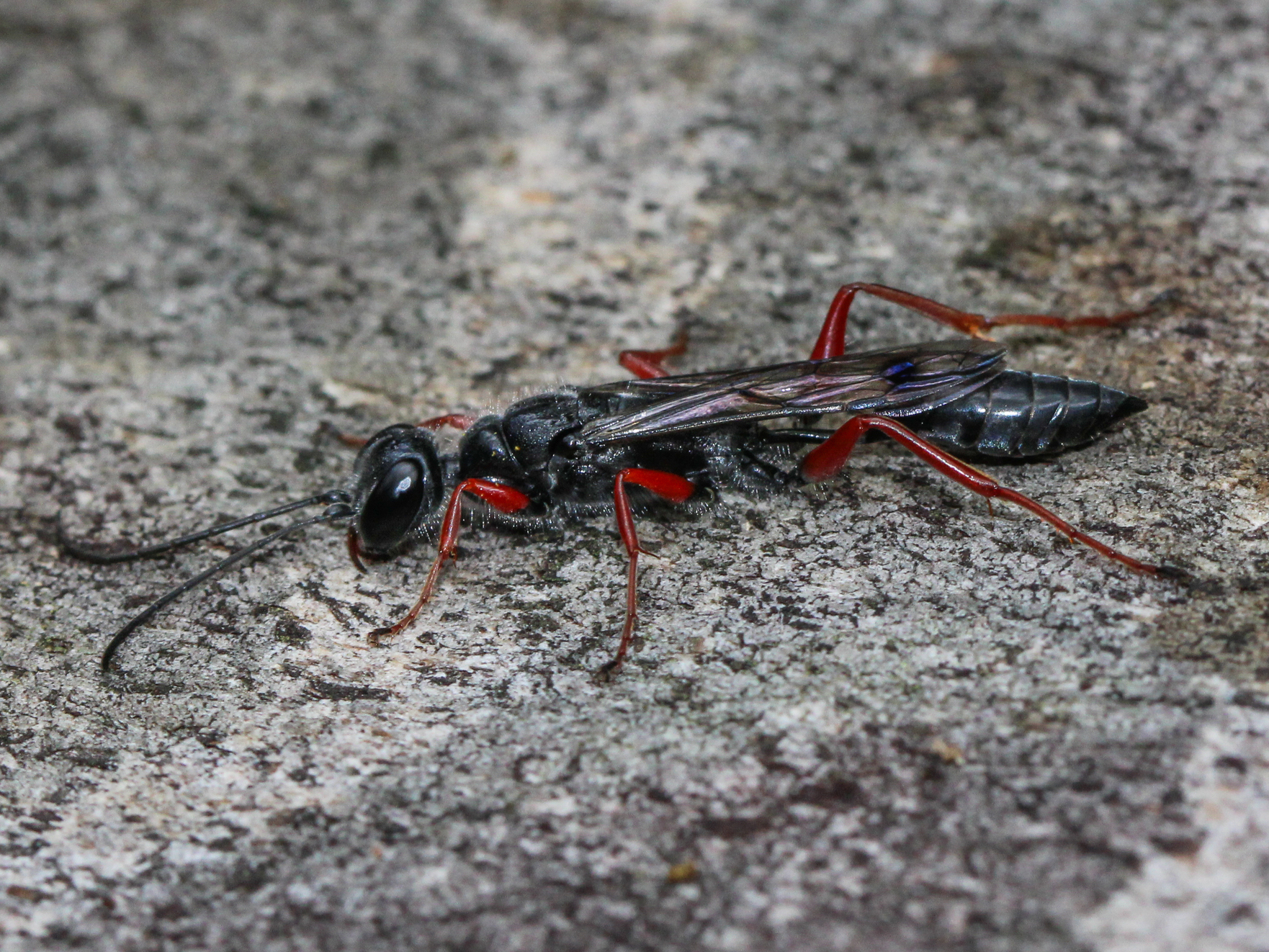
Podium rufipes in Florida.
