= Customer interaction management =

Customer Interaction Management (CIM) refers to a type of Enterprise Software Application which is responsible for managing the interaction between an organisation and its customers. Normally, a CIM application will be deployed in a contact centre and used by the agents while communicating with clients customers of the organisation. Customer Interaction Management systems handle communication across multiple different channels, such as (but not exclusive to) e-mail, SMS, telephone, Instant Messaging, whitemail (scanned documents) and social media.

== See also ==
- Customer relationship management
