= Cim (archaeological site) =

Cim Early Christian Basilica
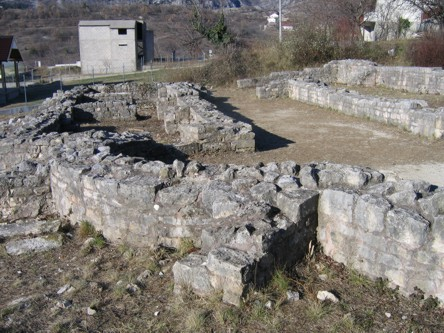
- Interactive map of the Cim Early Christian Basilica area

General information
- Type: Christian Basilica
- Architectural style: late antique era
- Location: Mostar, Bosnia and Herzegovina
- Coordinates: 43°21′13.7″N 17°46′28.6″E
- Completed: 5th–6th Century AD
- Owner: Bosnia and Herzegovina

Technical details
- Size: 69.5 by 30.9 m (228 by 101 ft)

The Cim Early Christian Basilica (built in 5th–6th century AD) consists of the archaeological remains of an early Christian–late Roman basilica in Mostar's Crkvine suburb. The basilica is a national monument of Bosnia and Herzegovina.

== Archaeological discoveries ==
During its archaeological excavation various other structures were discovered, including tombs and residential buildings. Further archaeological research has determined that the Crkvine site in northwestern Mostar was an ancient settlement, and a number of 5th- to 6th-century artifacts have been found.

Large quantities of small surface archeological material has also been discovered at the site: antique tiles, pottery, mudstone and glass. Fragments of stone decorations, such as vines with grapes and wattle, peacocks, fish, fragments of floral ornaments and the symbol of the cross, were also discovered.

Three late antique contemporary buildings were discovered in Crkvine area: the basilica, memorial chapel and a residential building. In the medieval period burials were carried out there. The early Christian basilica is positioned east-west and has one nave and the altar. The entrance is facing the west, while the altar apse, the most significant and the holiest part of the Church, is facing the east. Remains of additional buildings are located near the nave of the basilica - one to the north and two to the south – which creates the impression that the Church has three naves.

In the west all three parts of the Church are united by the narthex (the church hall) which stretches throughout the entire length of the space. Early Christian Basilica Cim has all the elements of the early Christian sacral building: narthex in the west part of the Church, nave (temple) in the centre, presbytery (altar area), baptistery (baptismal font), as well as diaconicon and prothesis in the south part.

A memorial (burial chapel) whose shape, with one nave, resembles the shape of the church is located south of the church. The memorial is connected with the main church area with a wall. The door at the south wall of diaconicon is the only way of communication between “the church for the dead” and “the church for the living”.

A great number of tombs and graves have been found around the Church, its interior, and within the memorial, dating from the time of the Church's construction until the late Middle Ages. More significant finds on this site are the fragments of the stone plastics with various ornamentation of which some are the most exceptional samples of early Christian sculpture in Bosnia and Herzegovina. Due to the level of fragmentation it is not always easy to determine the origin of these fragments and what their function was. Although there are no reliable historical sources that support the claim that the seat of Diocese of Sarsenterum was in this area at the time, the unusual arrangement of the Early Christian Basilica Cim with presbytery, and memorial, as well as the richness and representative quality of the fragment decorations, suggests that the bishop’s residence might have been here.

== Commemoration ==
In 2011, the Mostar post office issued a stamp with an image displaying the remains of Early Christian Basilica Cim.
