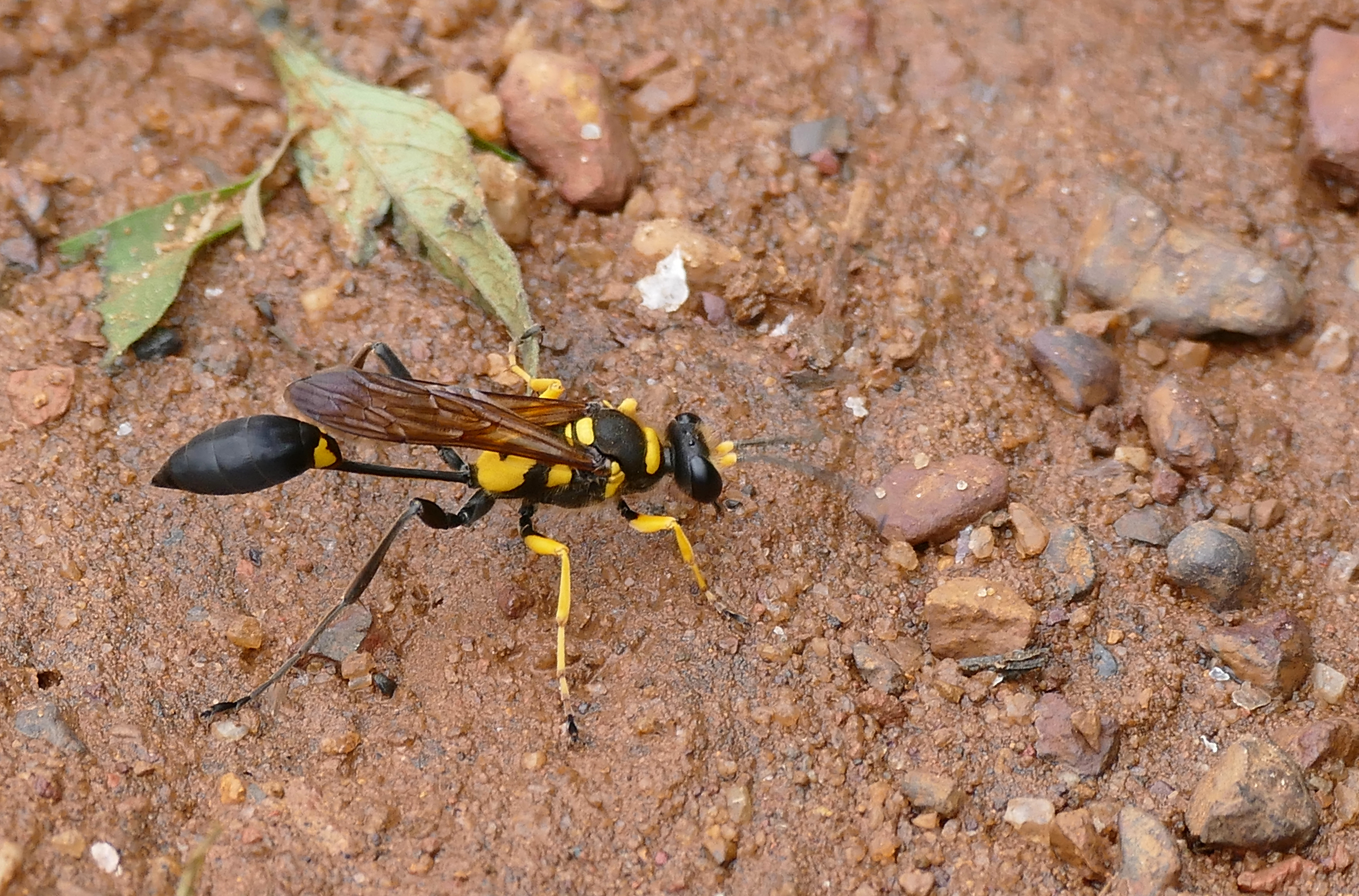
- S. asiaticum asiaticum

Scientific classification
- Kingdom: Animalia
- Phylum: Arthropoda
- Clade: Pancrustacea
- Class: Insecta
- Order: Hymenoptera
- Family: Sphecidae
- Tribe: Sceliphrini
- Genus: Sceliphron
- Species: S. asiaticum

Binomial name
- Sceliphron asiaticum (Linnaeus, 1758)

Synonyms
- Sphex asiaticus Linnaeus, 1758; Pelopoeus figulus Dahlbom, 1843; Pelopoeus vindexLepeletier, 1845; Sceliphron figulum (Dahlbom, 1843); Sceliphron vindex (Lepeletier de Saint Fargeau, 1845); Sceliphron figulus rufescens Strand, 1910

= Sceliphron asiaticum =

Species of wasp

Sceliphron asiaticum is a species of thread-waisted wasp in the family Sphecidae.

== Distribution and habitat ==
It is native to the Neotropics, from Panama into South America and the islands of Trinidad, Aruba, and Curaçao. The subspecies S. a. chilense is restricted to Chile.

== Description ==
The adult S. asiaticum has a black head, a black thorax with yellow bands, an elongated waist and a black abdomen, apart from the first abdominal segment which is yellow. The antennae are black, the wings membranous, and the legs yellow and black. In the subspecies S. a. asiaticum, the propodeum has a single, broad transverse band and is identical in coloration to S. assimile, while in the subspecies S. a. chilense, the propodeum is entirely black.

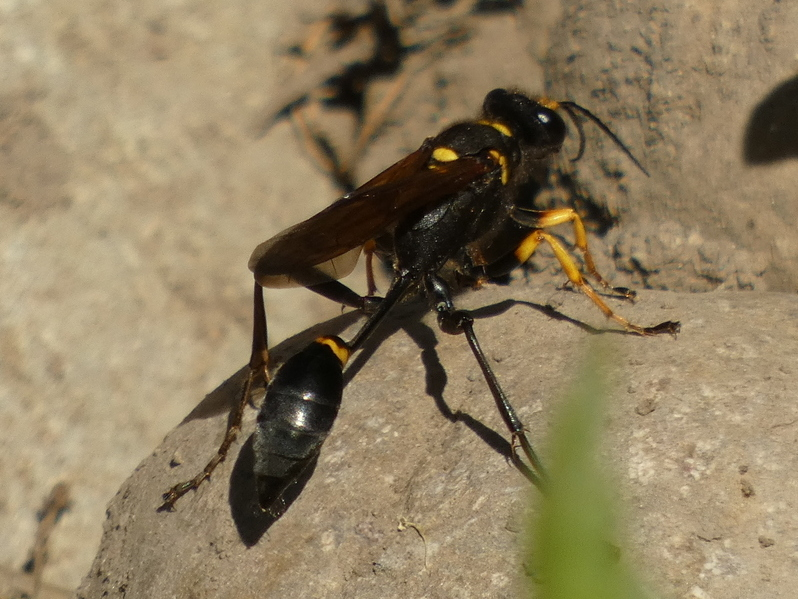
S. asiaticum chilense

== Ecology ==
In Trinidad, the two wasps S. asiaticum and S. fistularium have overlapping ranges; S. asiaticum tends to occupy drier areas with less forest cover. It also tends to form denser associations and the larvae are usually more heavily parasitised. Wasps in the genus Sceliphron collect mud to make cells in which to lay their eggs. One or more paralysed spiders is placed in each cell to provide food for the developing larva. There is a relationship between female size, fecundity and the sex of the offspring: small females lay fewer eggs, a higher proportion of which develop into males, thereby maximising the reproductive success of the female.

== Interaction with other species ==
Melittobia asiaticum is a parasitoid of S. asiaticum. It is between 1 and 1.5 mm (0.04 and 0.06 in) long and causes considerable mortality among the larvae of its host. One mud nest of S. asiaticum was collected from a house in northeastern Brazil; it was built of sandy silt, incorporated detritus and faeces, and contained twelve chambers. Each chamber was provisioned with spider body parts and occupied by a single host larva. All of these were parasitised and killed by M. asiaticum, leaving dry pupal husks. A total of over 100 adult M. asiaticum and no S. asiaticum emerged from the nest. The spiders used for provisioning were all cursorial (running) spiders and no orb-weaver spiders were observed, which was an unexpected finding.
