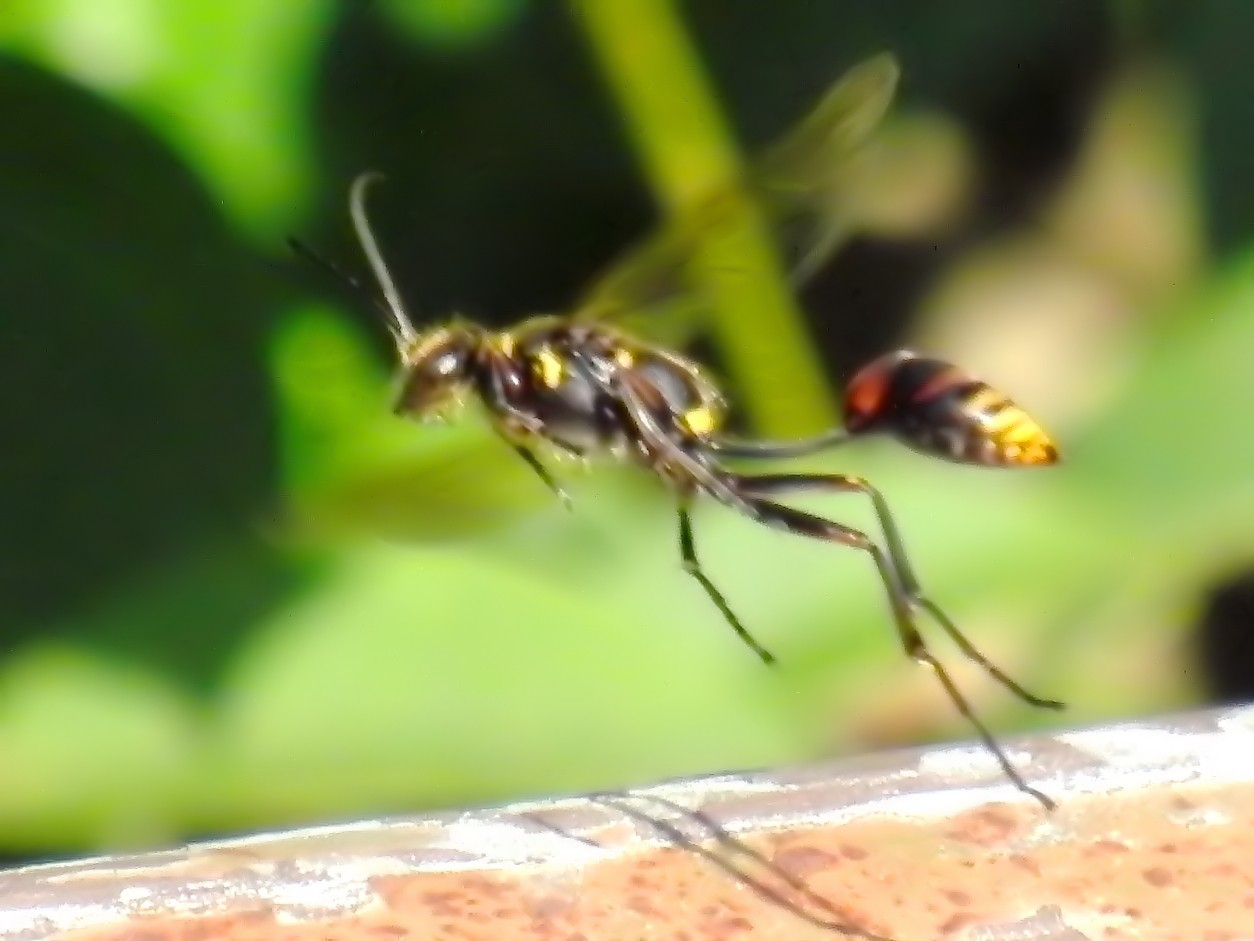
- S. deforme deforme in Hong Kong

Scientific classification
- Kingdom: Animalia
- Phylum: Arthropoda
- Clade: Pancrustacea
- Class: Insecta
- Order: Hymenoptera
- Family: Sphecidae
- Tribe: Sceliphrini
- Genus: Sceliphron
- Species: S. deforme

Binomial name
- Sceliphron deforme (F. Smith, 1856)

= Sceliphron deforme =

Species of wasp

Sceliphron deforme is a species of thread-waisted wasp in the family Sphecidae.

== Distribution and habitat ==
It is native to southern Asia and has been introduced to European Russia (Nizhny Novgorod and Saratovskaya Oblasts), Mordovia, and Montenegro. Additional reports in Europe outside of these ranges were misidentified Sceliphron curvatum.

== Subspecies ==
These five subspecies belong to the species Sceliphron deforme:

- Sceliphron deforme atripes (F. Morawitz, 1888)
- Sceliphron deforme deforme (F. Smith, 1856)
- Sceliphron deforme femorale Hensen, 1987
- Sceliphron deforme nipponicum Tsuneki, 1972
- Sceliphron deforme tibiale Cameron, 1899

== Gallery ==
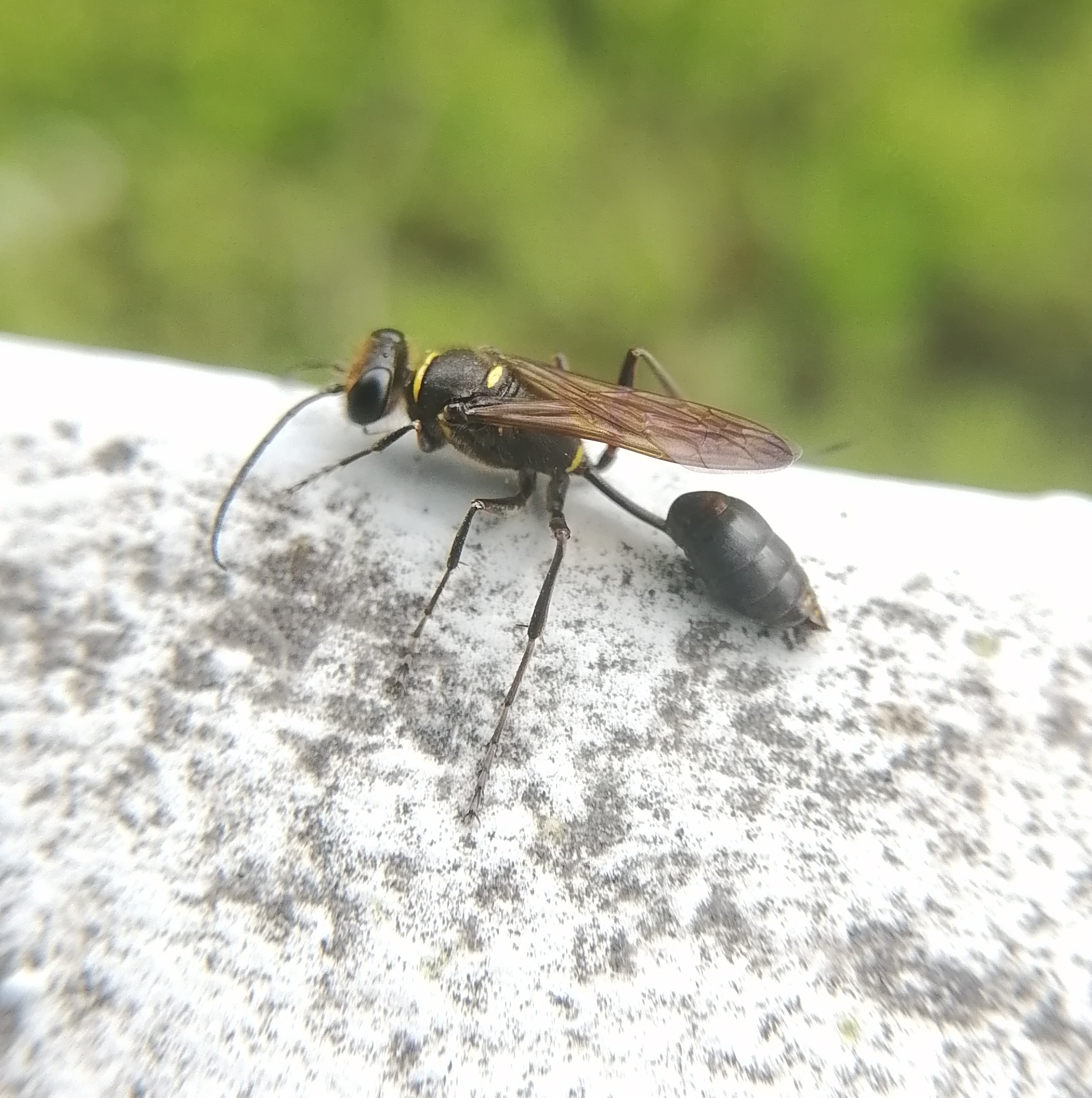
S. (Hensenia) deforme atripes in Russia.

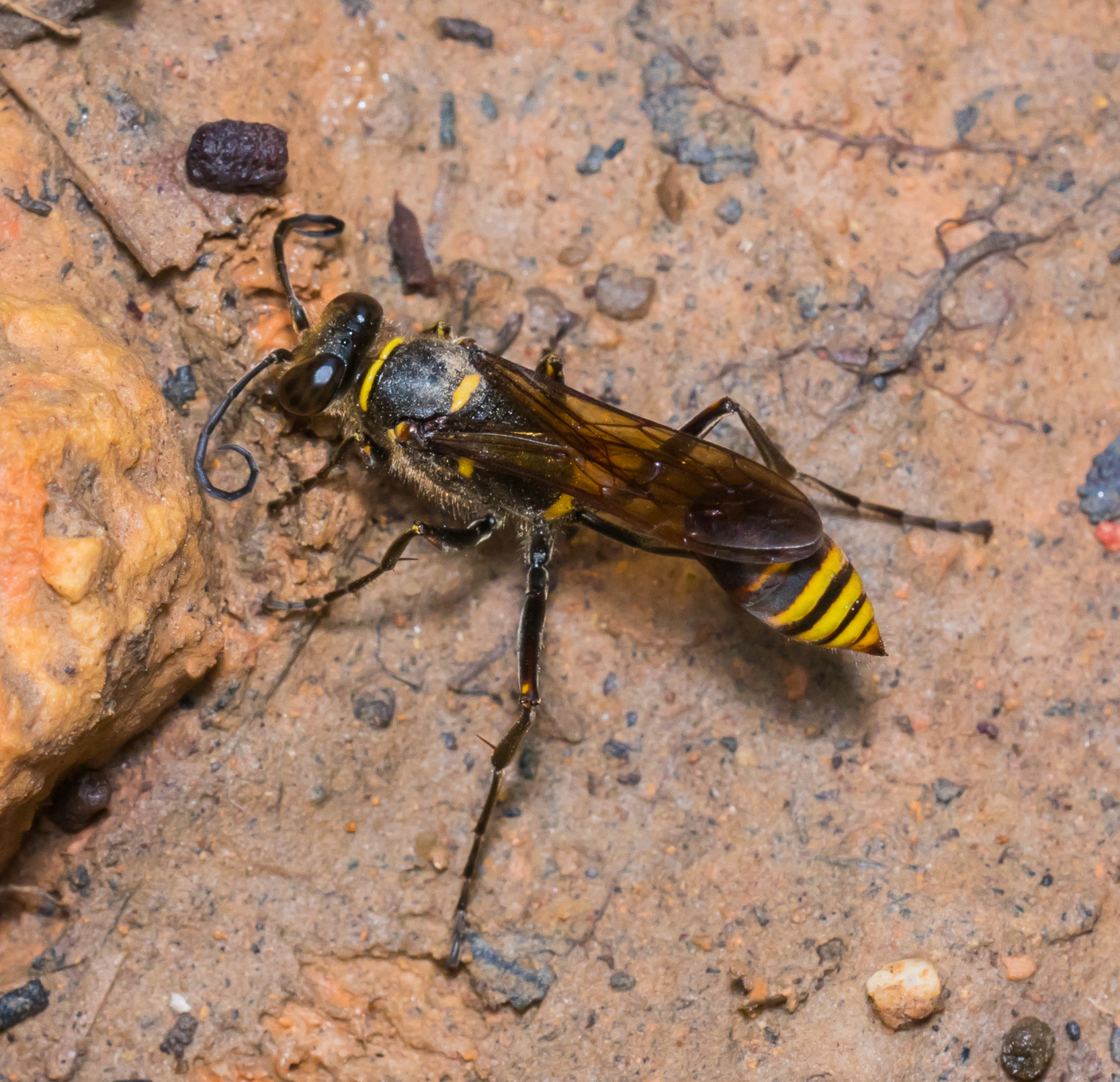
S. (Hensenia) deforme deforme in Hong Kong.
