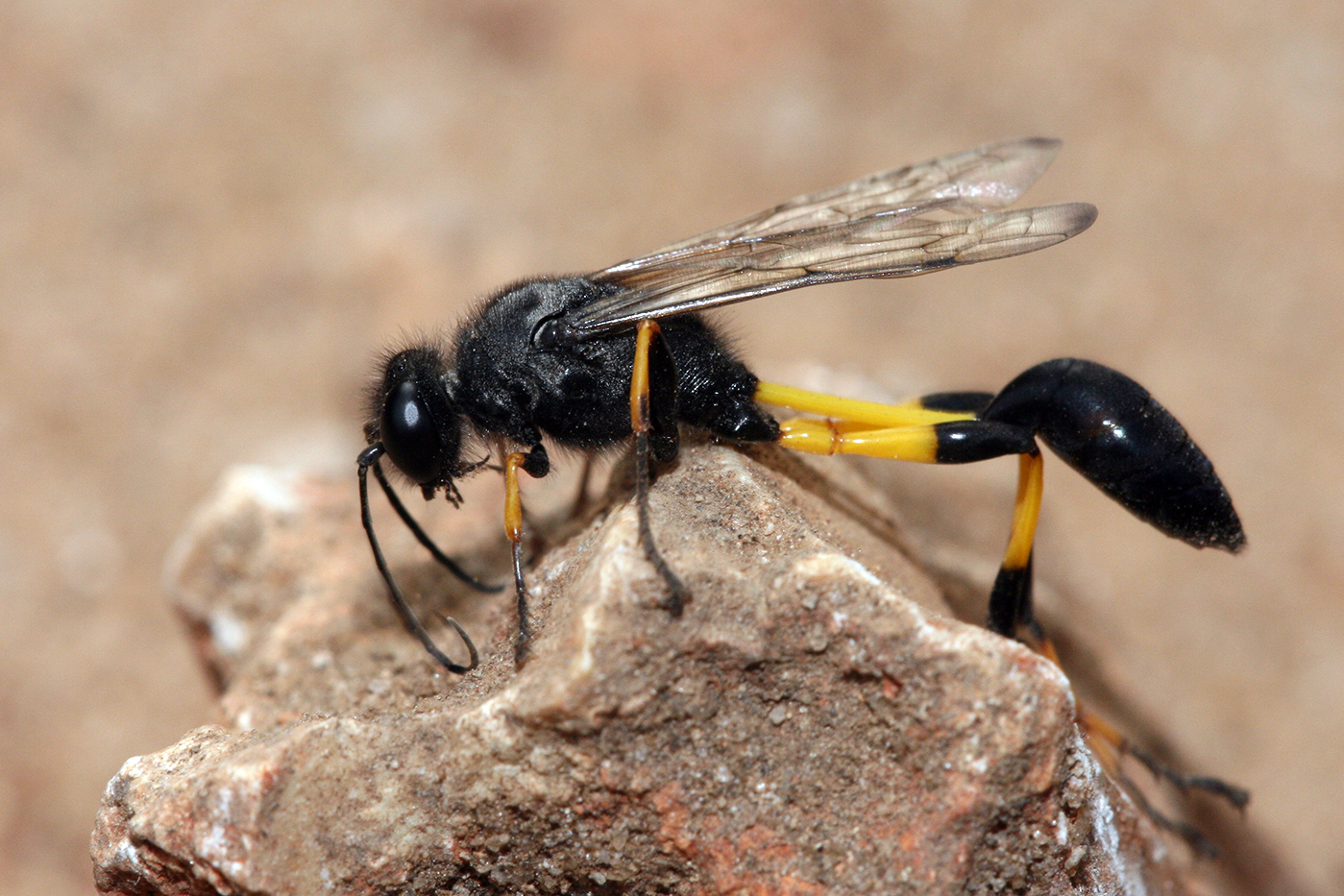
- Sceliphron spirifex in Tanzania

Scientific classification
- Kingdom: Animalia
- Phylum: Arthropoda
- Clade: Pancrustacea
- Class: Insecta
- Order: Hymenoptera
- Family: Sphecidae
- Subfamily: Sceliphrinae
- Tribe: Sceliphrini
- Genus: Sceliphron; Klug, 1801

Species
- 33 extant + 1 extinct species

Synonyms
- Pelopoeus Latreille, 1802

= Sceliphron =

Genus of wasps

Sceliphron, also known as black-and-yellow mud dauber wasps or black mud-dauber wasps, is a genus of Hymenoptera of the Sphecidae family of wasps. They are solitary mud daubers and build nests made of mud.

As is the case with many insect genera, there are many tropical species. Some common temperate species include S. caementarium and S. curvatum.

== Taxonomy and phylogeny ==
Sceliphron was divided into the subgenera S. (Sceliphron) and S. (Prosceliphron) by van der Vecht and van Breugel. They further divided the nominate subgenus into two species groups: the S. madraspatanum species-group and the S. spirifex species-group. However, due to Prosceliphron van der Vecht, 1968 being a junior homonym of Prosceliphron Frenguelli, 1946, Pagliano and Scaramozzino established the replacement name S. (Hensenia).

The subgenus S. (Sceliphron) builds nests that have with multiple cells covered in a secondary layer of mud while the subgenus S. (Hensenia) builds single-cell nests lacking a secondary layer of mud.

== Behavior ==
Nests are frequently constructed in shaded niches, often just inside of windows or vent openings, and it may take a female only a day to construct a cell requiring dozens of trips carrying mud. Females will add new cells one by one to the nest after each cell is provisioned. They provision these nests with spiders, such as crab spiders, orb-weaver spiders and jumping spiders in particular, as food for the developing larvae. Each mud cell contains one egg and is provided with several prey items. Females of some species lay a modest average of 15 eggs over their whole lifespan. Various parasites attack these nests, including several species of cuckoo wasps, primarily by sneaking into the nest while the resident mud dauber is out foraging.

Like other solitary wasps, Sceliphron species are not aggressive unless threatened. They are sometimes regarded as beneficial due to their control of spider populations, though the spiders themselves may be beneficial in controlling pest insects. Species such as Sceliphron curvatum are invasive in some parts of Europe, where they have been observed to rapidly increase their range in recent years.

== Species ==
There are 33 valid living species of Sceliphron.

=== Subgenus Sceliphron (Hensenia) Pagliano & Scaramozzino, 1990 ===
- Sceliphron coromandelicum (Lepeletier, 1845)
- Sceliphron curvatum (Smith, 1870) – Asia, Europe since 1970s
- Sceliphron deforme (F. Smith, 1856); Asia, reported from Europe in 2004
- Sceliphron fervens (F. Smith, 1858)
- Sceliphron formosum (F. Smith, 1856) - Australia
- Sceliphron funestum Kohl, 1918
- Sceliphron murarium (F. Smith, 1863)
- Sceliphron neobilineatum Jha & Farooqi, 1995
- Sceliphron rectum Kohl, 1918
- Sceliphron rufopictum (F. Smith, 1856)
- Sceliphron shestakovi Gussakovskij, 1928
- Sceliphron unifasciatum (F. Smith, 1860)

=== Subgenus Sceliphron (Sceliphron) Klug, 1801 ===
- Sceliphron isaaci Jha and Farooqi, 1995
- Sceliphron paraintrudens Jha & Farooqi, 1995
- Sceliphron seistaniensis Jha and Farooqi, 1995

==== Sceliphron madraspatanum species-group ====
- Sceliphron argentifrons (Cresson, 1916)
- Sceliphron asiaticum (Linnaeus, 1758) - Neotropics
- Sceliphron assimile (Dahlbom, 1843) – Texas, Mexico and Caribbean islands
- Sceliphron caementarium (Drury, 1773) – North America, established in Europe and Pacific islands by the 1970s
- Sceliphron fasciatum (Lepeletier de Saint Fargeau, 1845)
- Sceliphron fossuliferum (Gribodo, 1895)
- Sceliphron intrudens (F. Smith, 1858)
- Sceliphron jamaicense Fabricius, 1775 - Mexico, Caribbean islands
- Sceliphron madraspatanum (Fabricius, 1781) - Mediterranean
- Sceliphron quartinae (Gribodo, 1884)

==== Sceliphron spirifex species-group ====
- Sceliphron arabs (Lepeletier de Saint Fargeau, 1845)
- Sceliphron destillatorium (Illiger, 1807) - southern Palaearctic
- Sceliphron fistularium (Dahlbom, 1843) - Neotropics
- Sceliphron fuscum Klug, 1801
- Sceliphron javanum Lepeletier, 1845
- Sceliphron laetum (F. Smith, 1856); Australia
- Sceliphron pietschmanni Kohl, 1918
- Sceliphron spirifex (Linnaeus, 1758) - Africa, southern Europe

== Extinct species ==
There is one described fossil species of Sceliphron:

- Sceliphron tertiarium Meunier, 1915

== Gallery ==
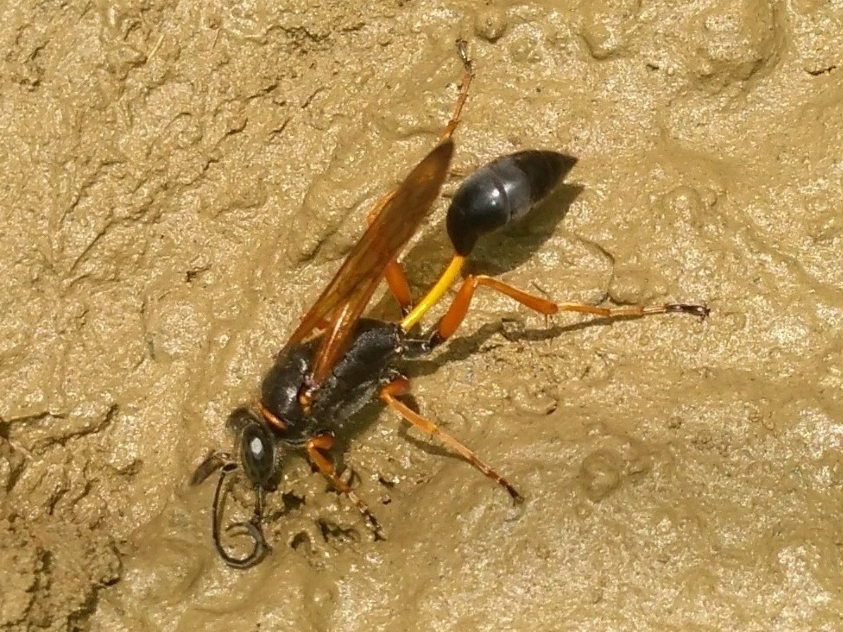
S. (Hensenia) coromandelicum in India.

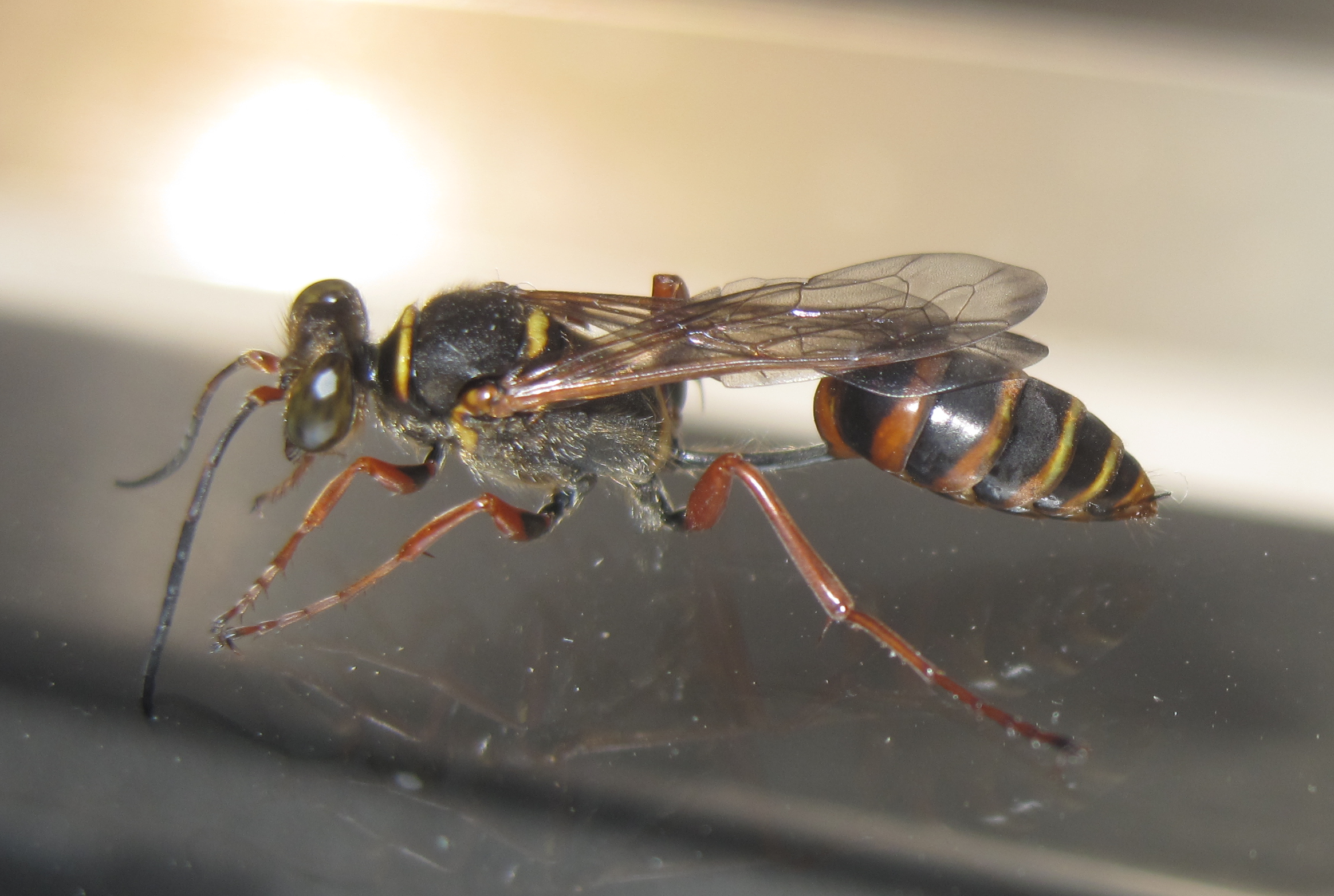
S. (Hensenia) curvatum in Greece.

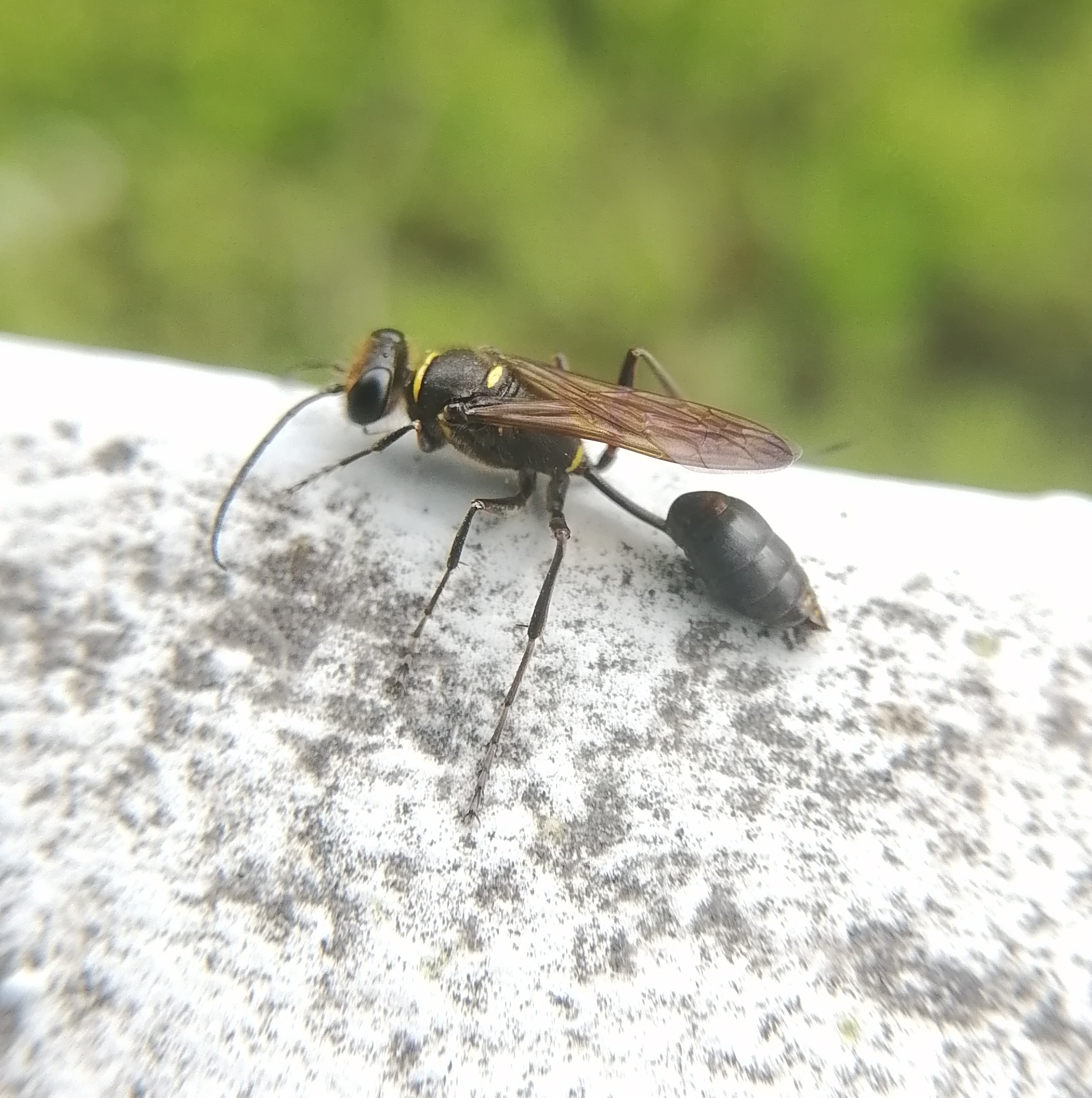
S. (Hensenia) deforme atripes in Russia.

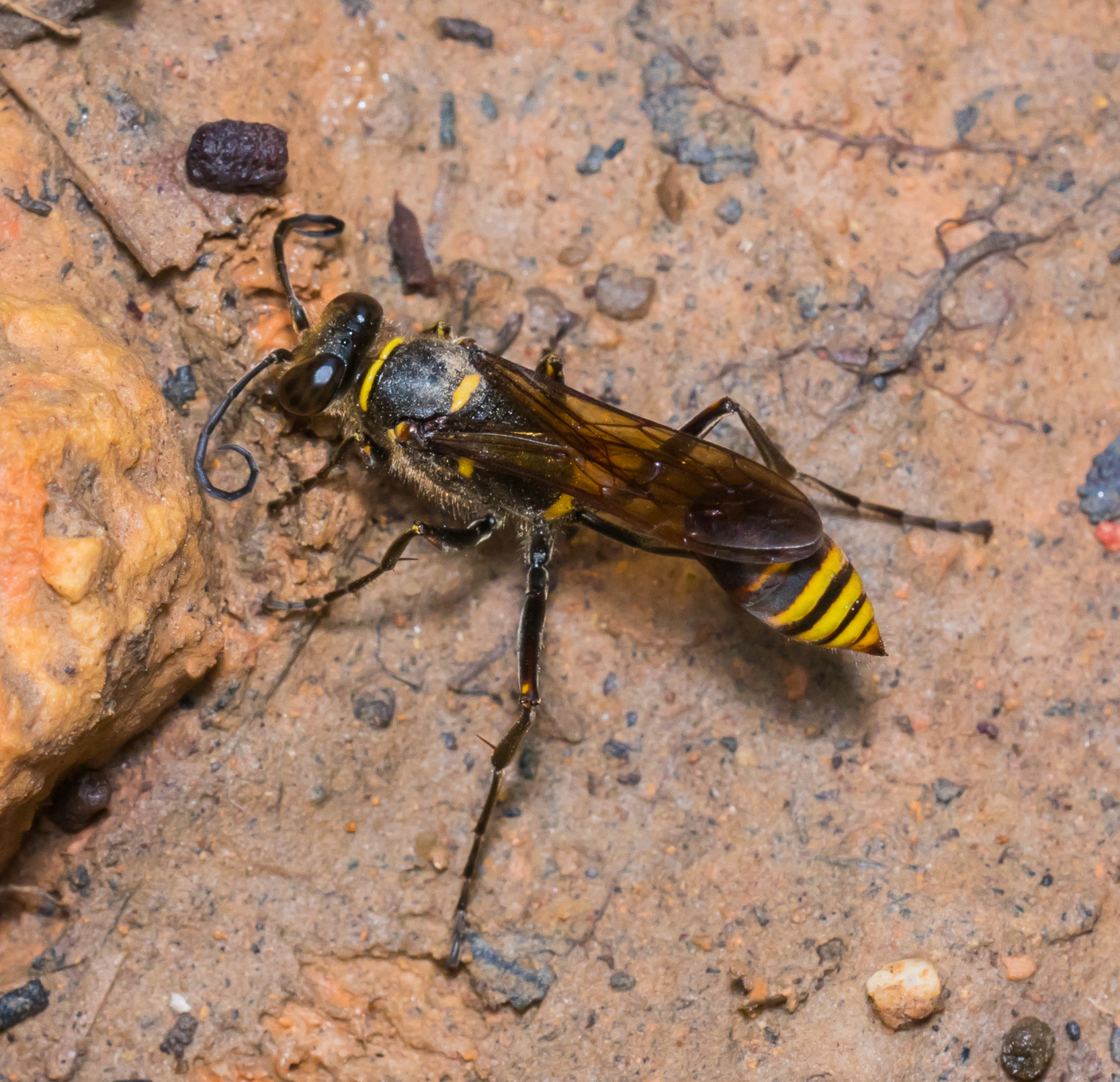
S. (Hensenia) deforme deforme in Hong Kong.

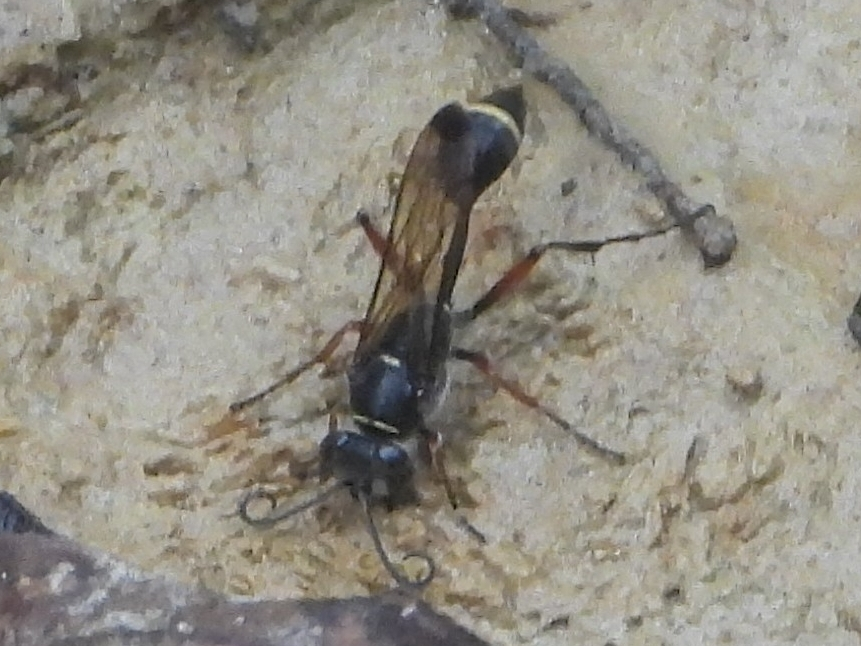
S. (Hensenia) fervens in Thailand.

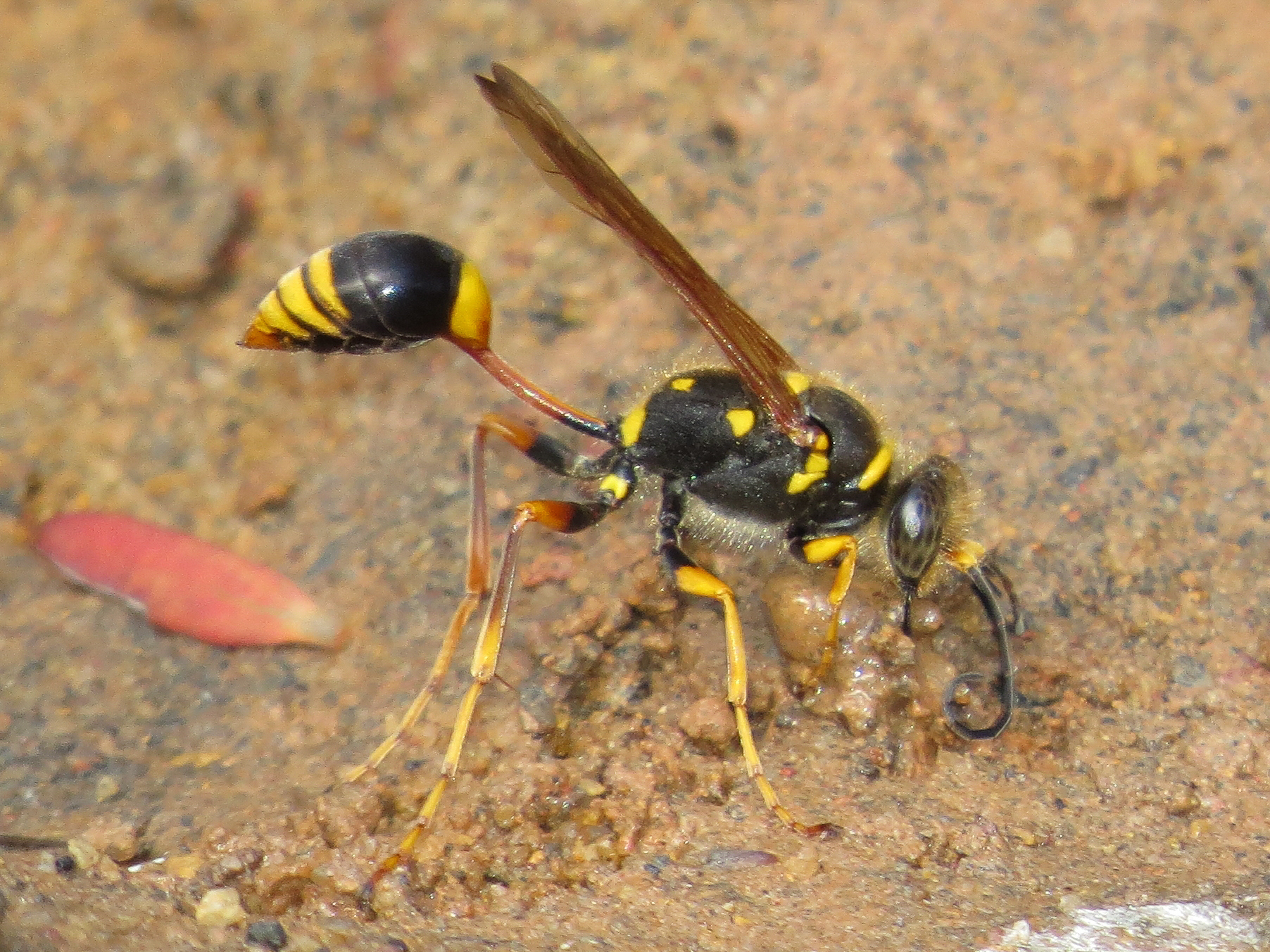
S. (Hensenia) formosum in Australia.

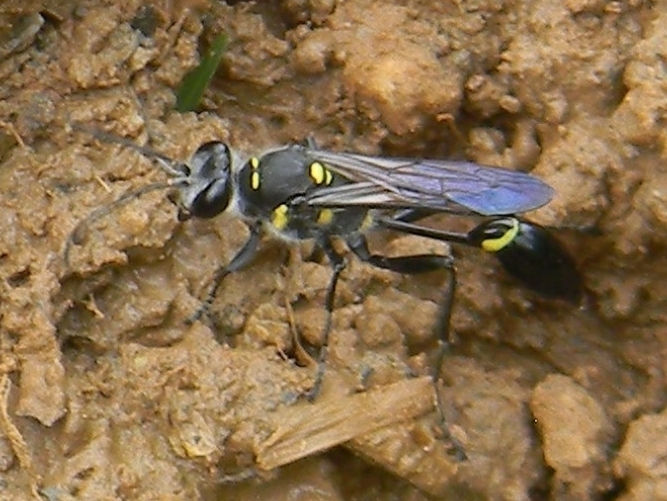
S. (Sceliphron) argentifrons in Cuba.

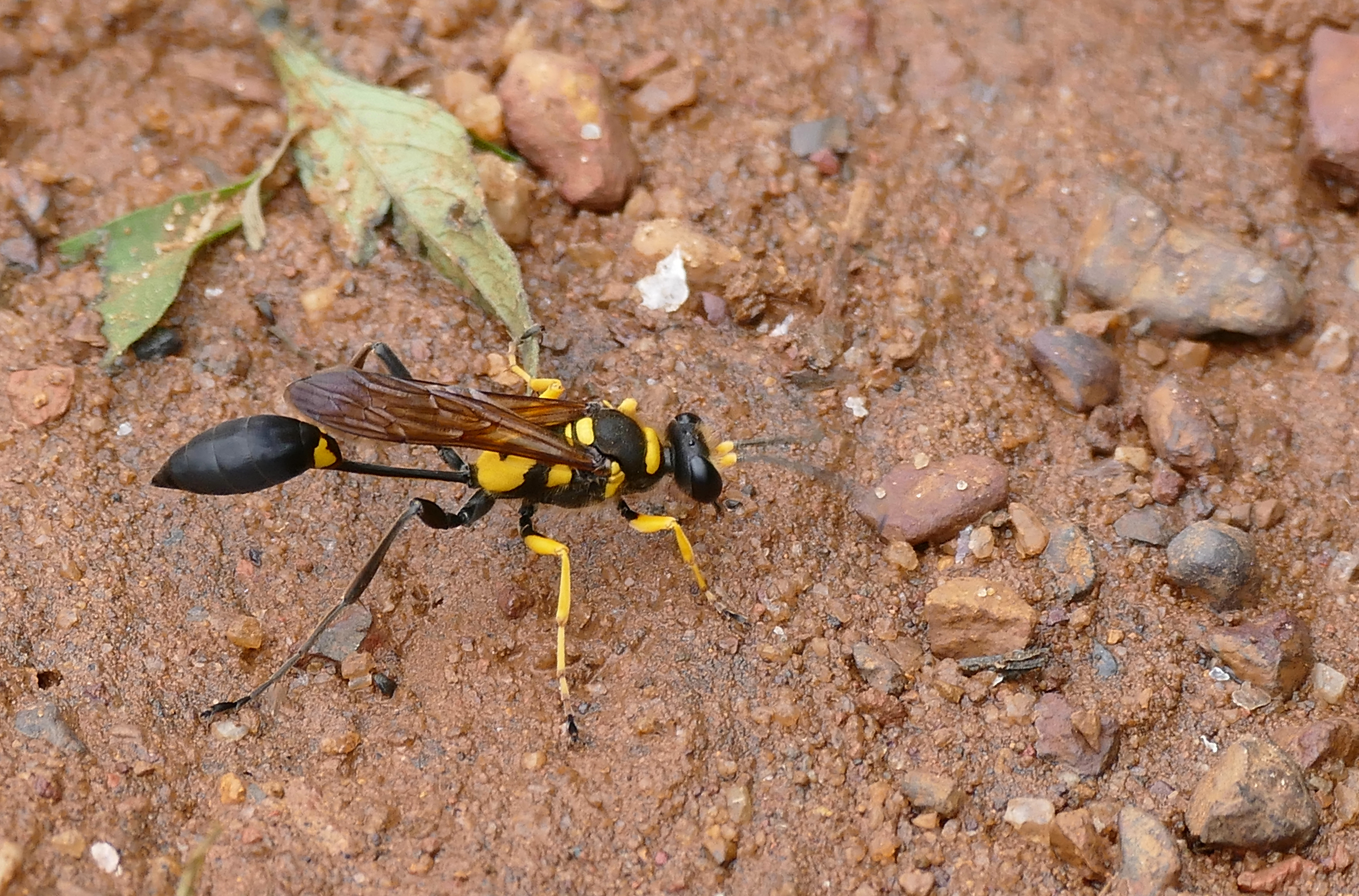
S. (Sceliphron) asiaticum asiaticum in French Guiana.

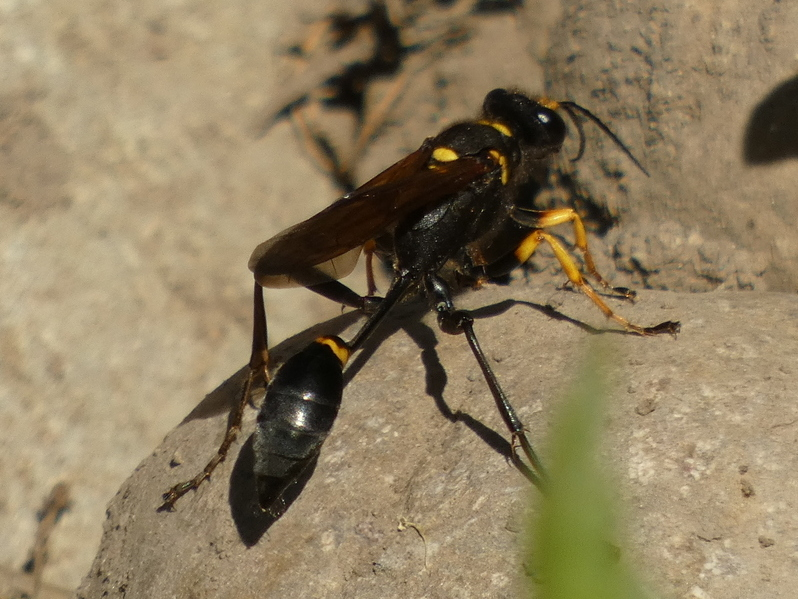
S. (Sceliphron) asiaticum chilense in Chile.

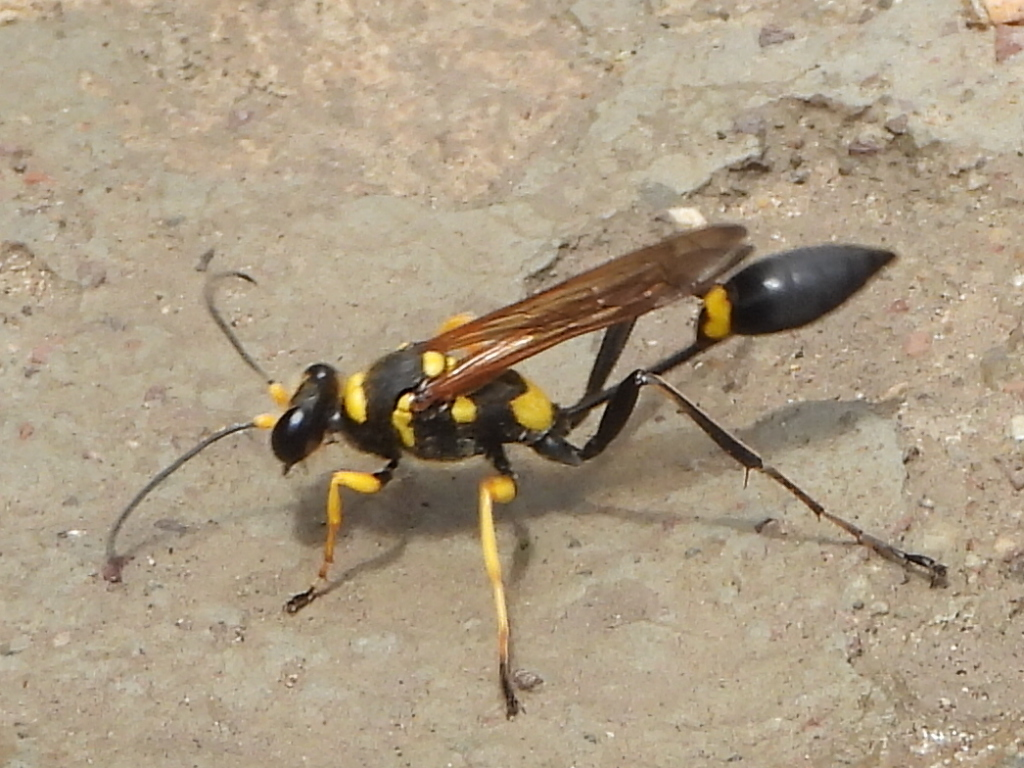
S. (Sceliphron) assimile in Mexico.

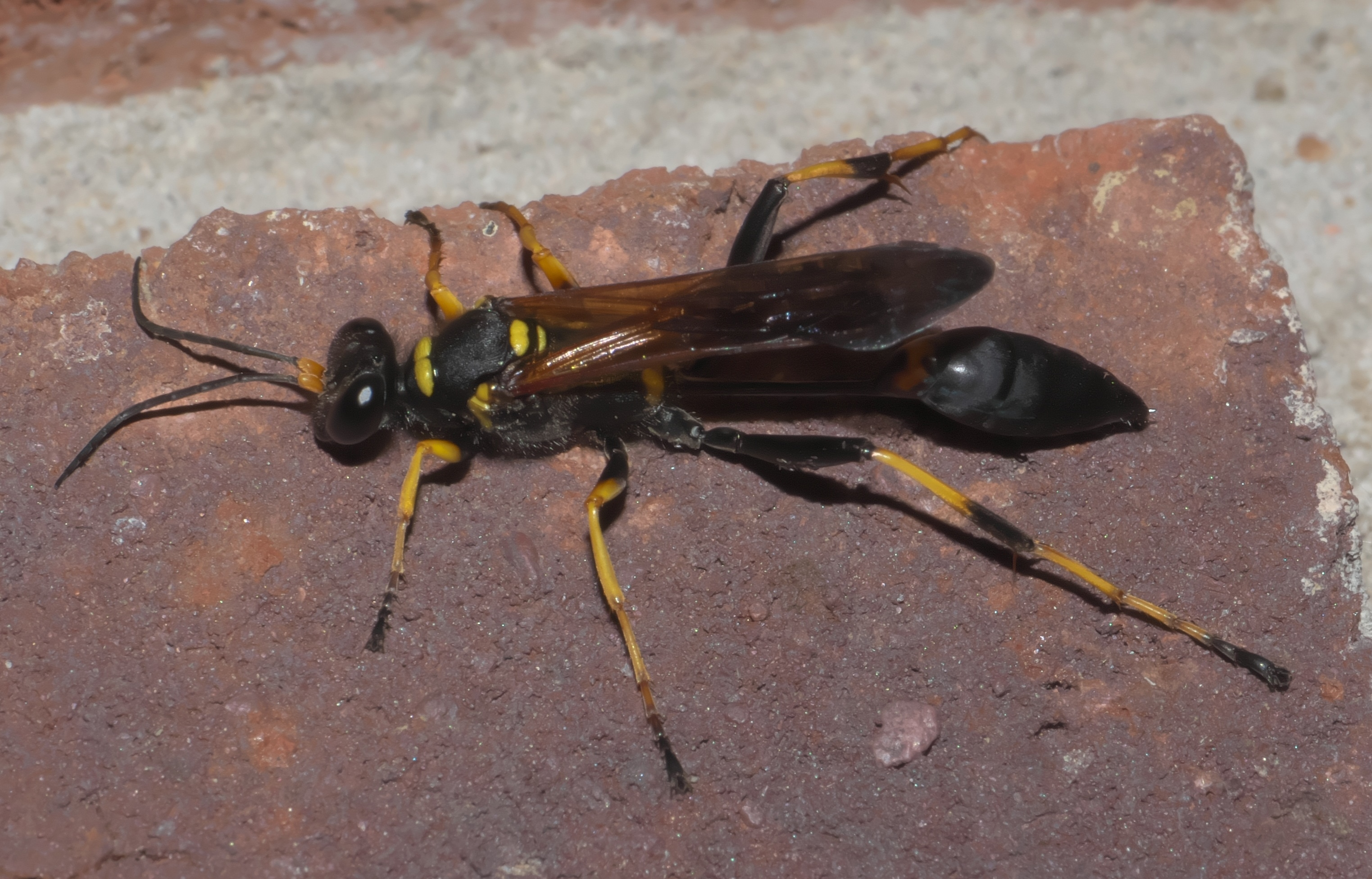
S. (Sceliphron) caementarium in Oklahoma.

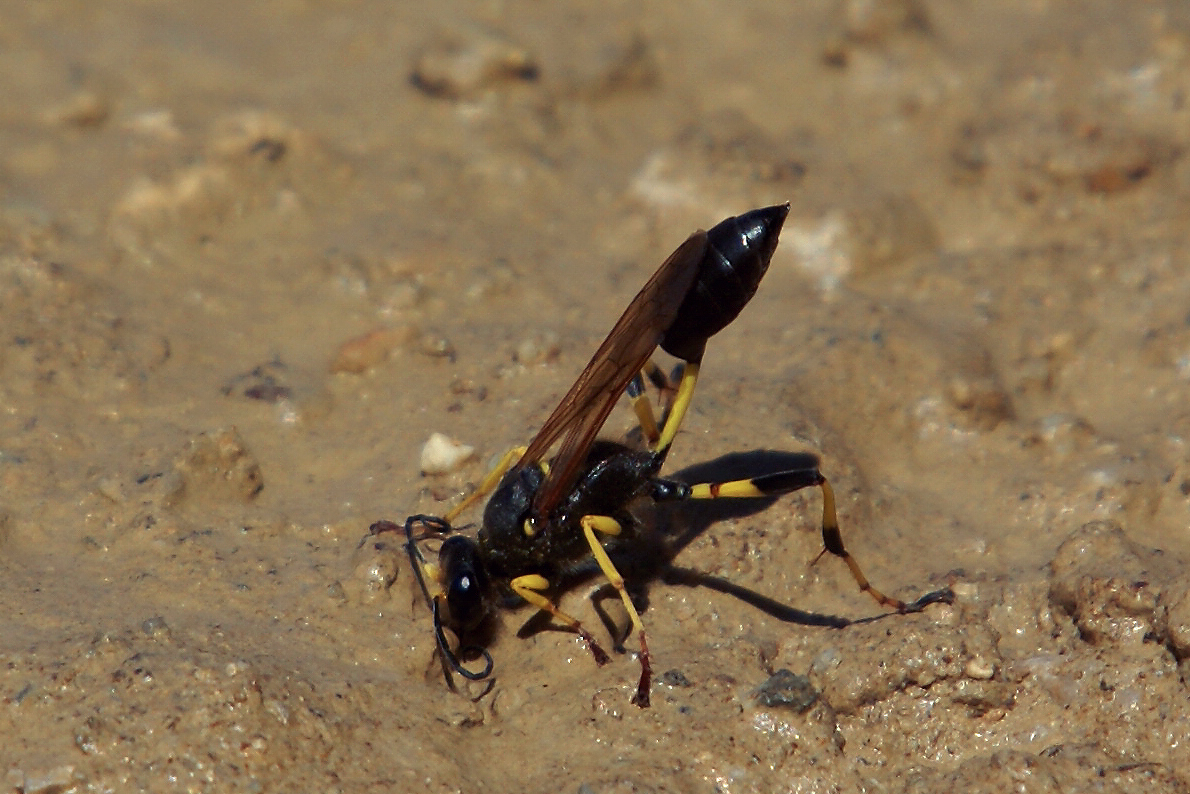
S. (Sceliphron) destillatorium in Spain.

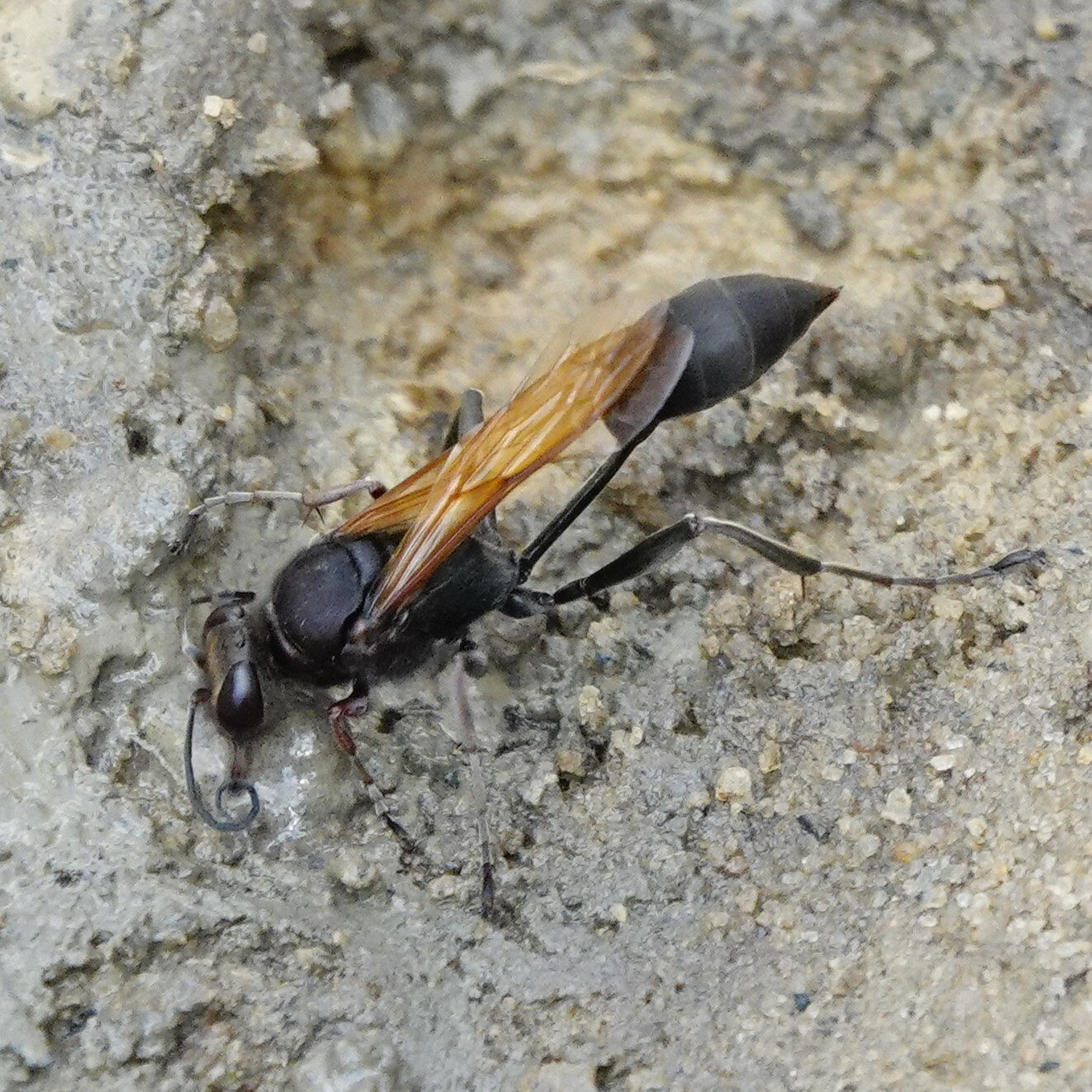
S. (Sceliphron) fuscum in Madagascar.

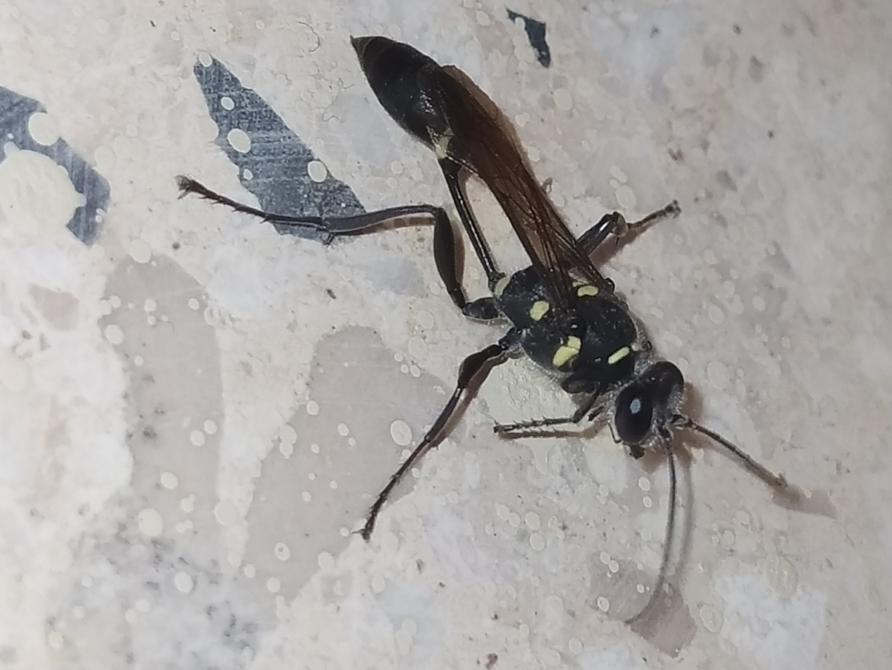
S. (Sceliphron) fasciatum in the Dominican Republic.

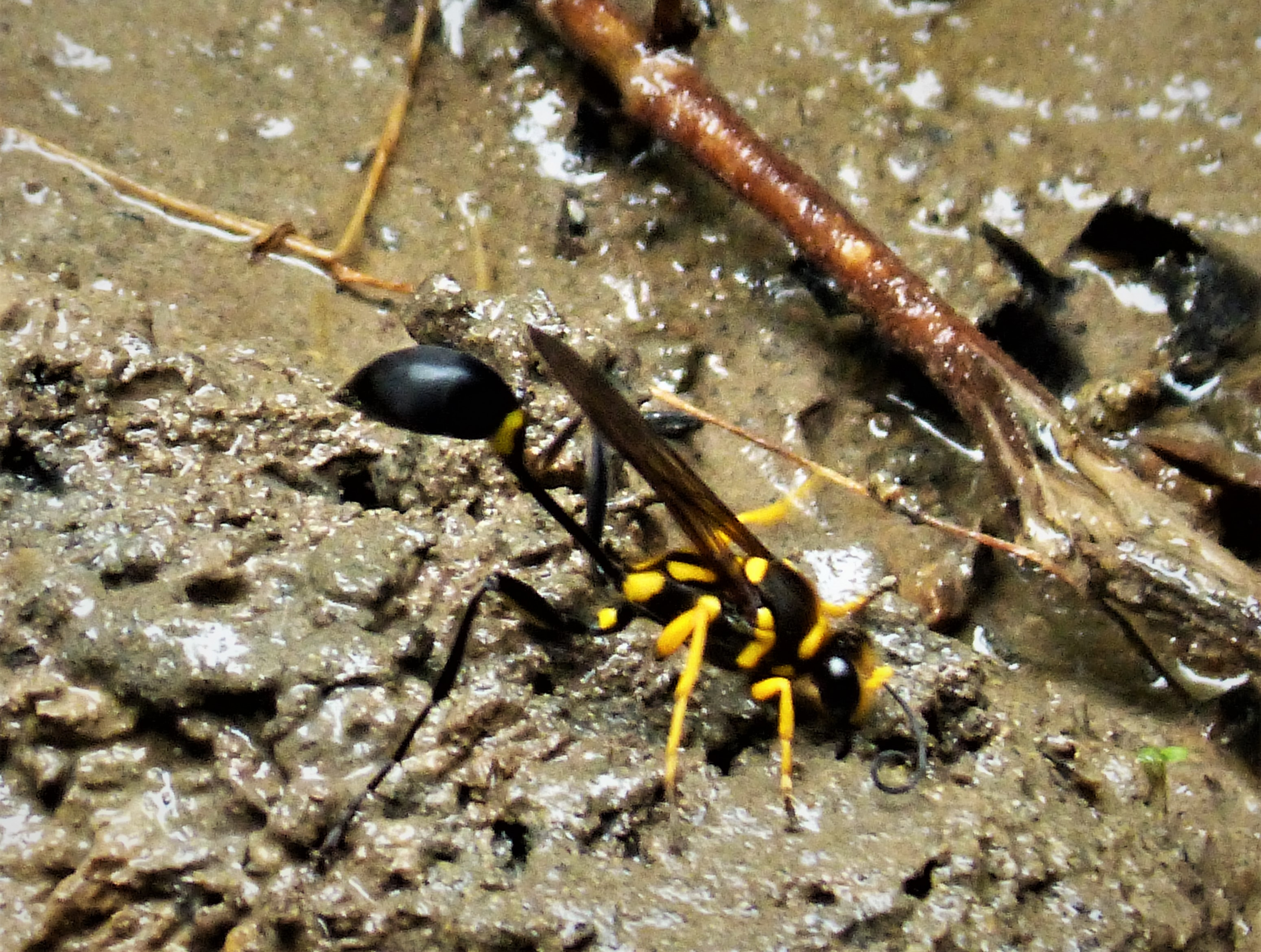
S. (Sceliphron) fistularium in Panama.

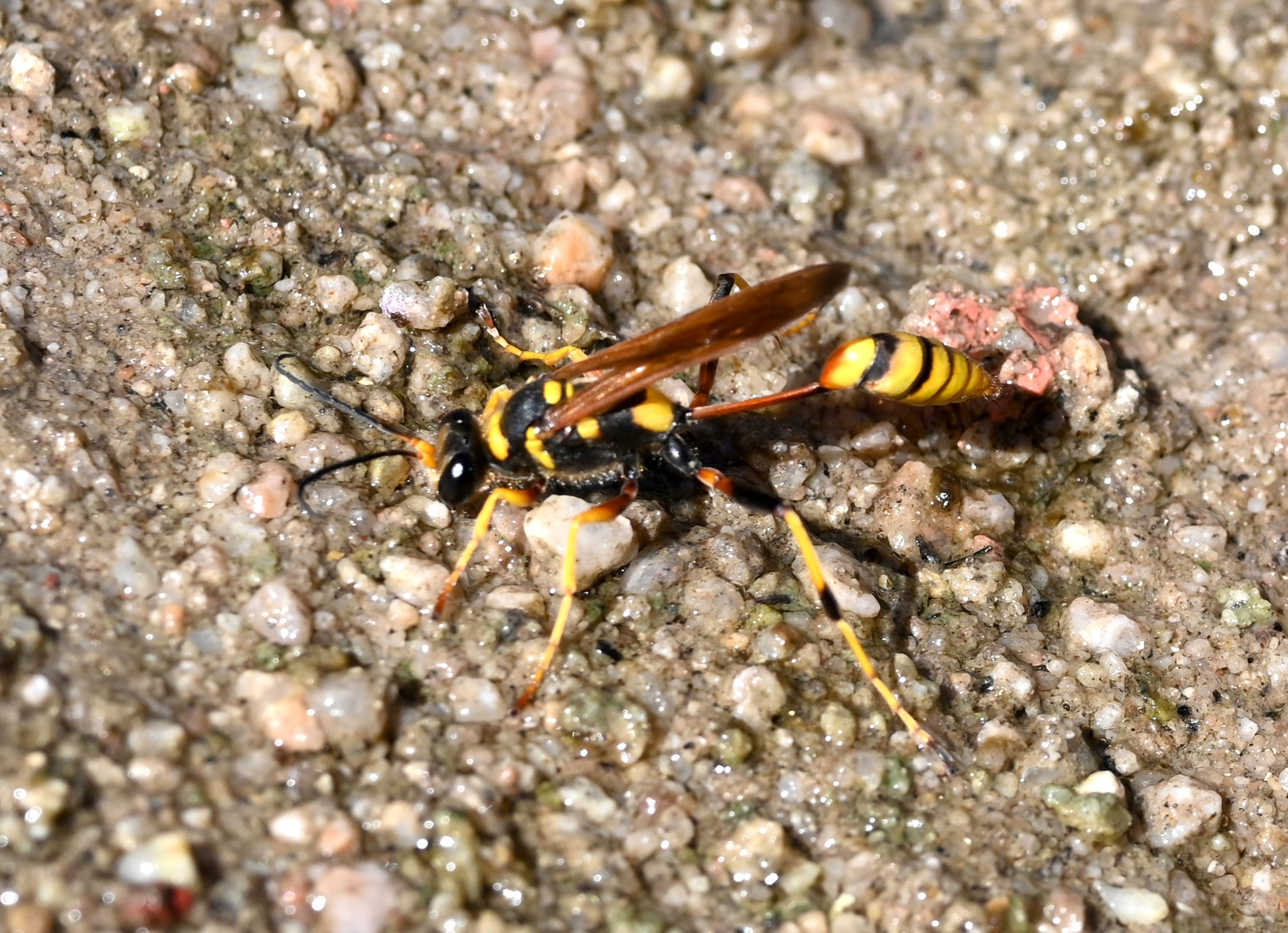
S. (Sceliphron) jamaicense lucae in Mexico.

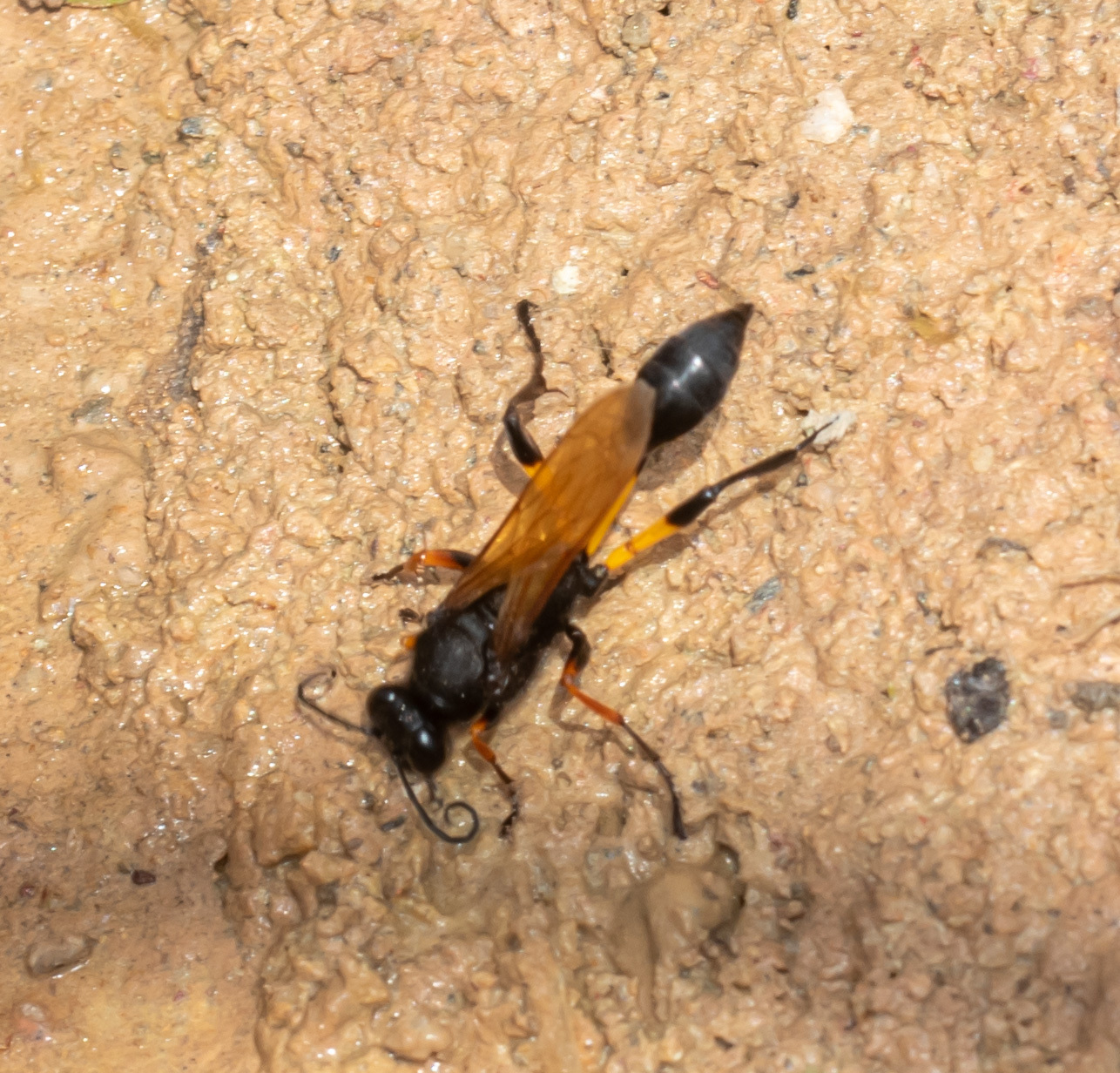
S. (Sceliphron) javanum in Sumatra, Indonesia.

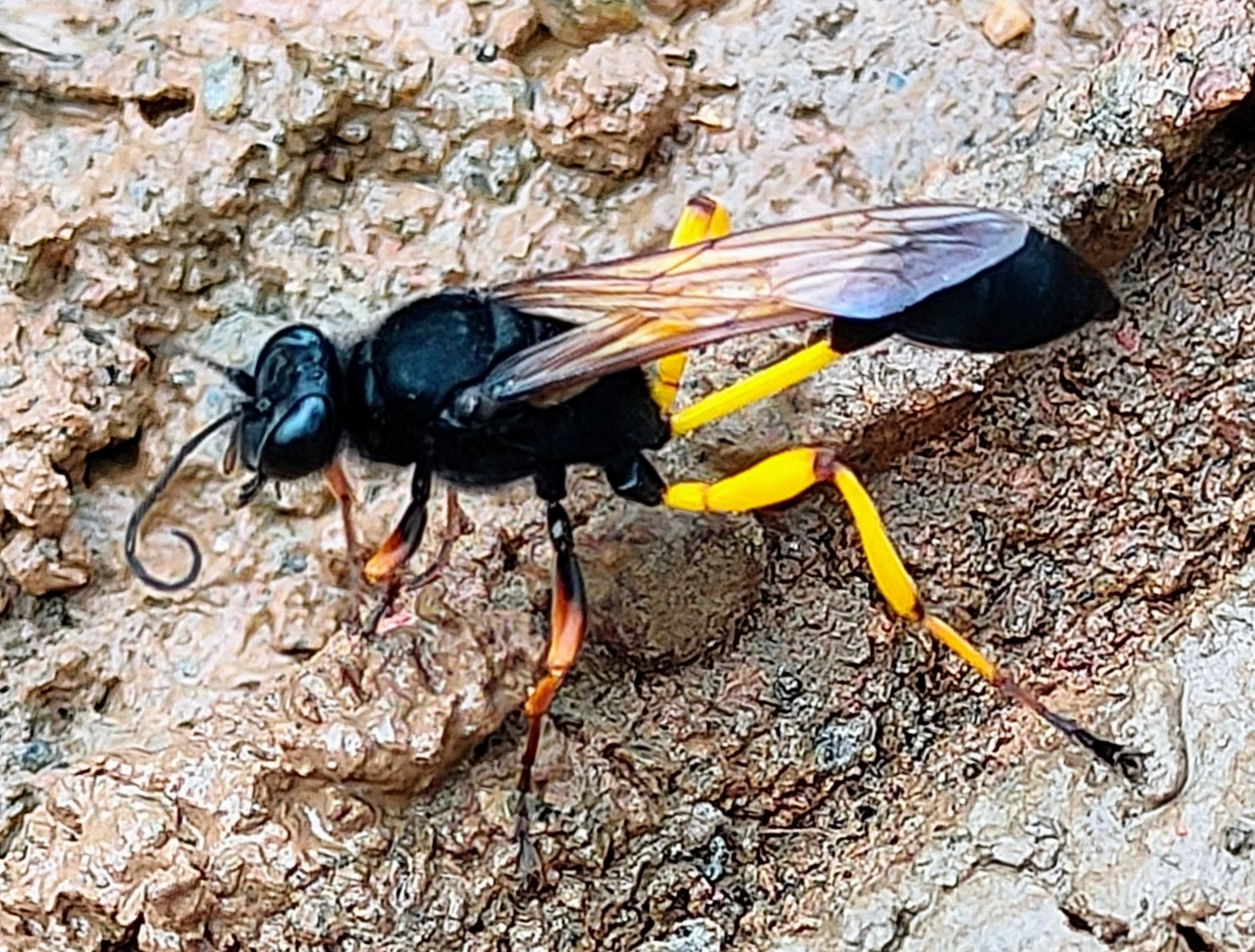
S. (Sceliphron) javanum nalandicum in India.

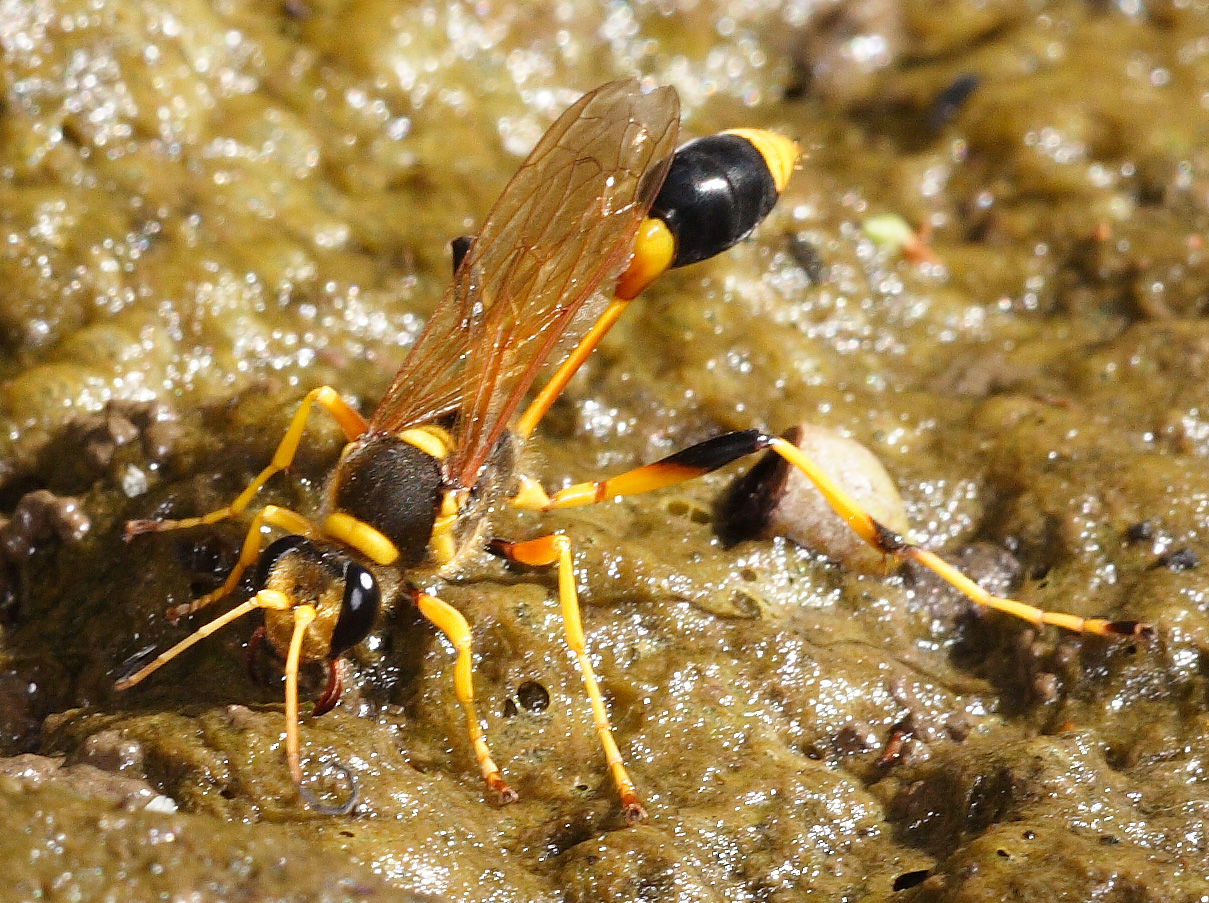
S. (Sceliphron) laetum in Australia.

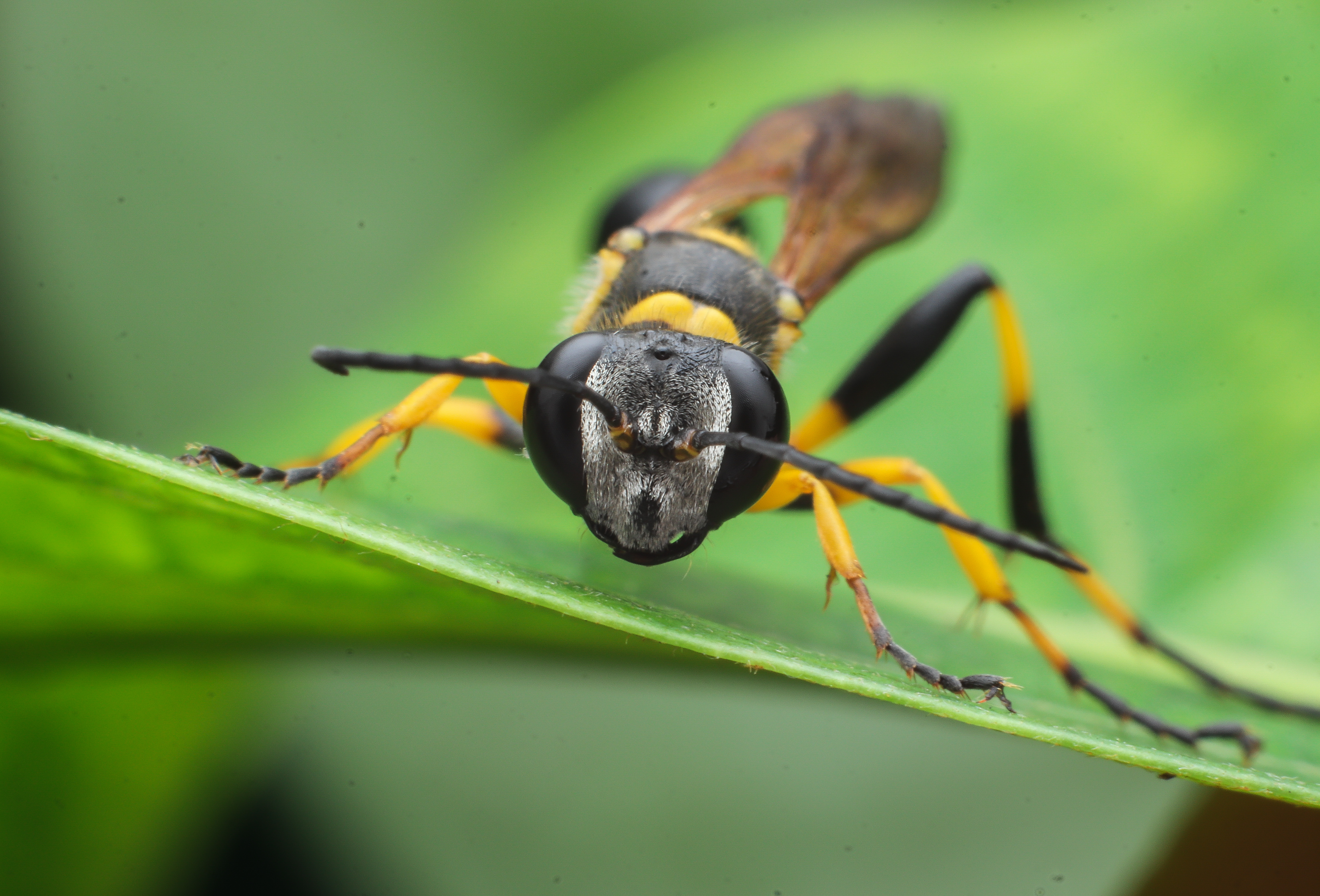
S. (Sceliphron) madraspatanum conspicillatum in the Philippines.

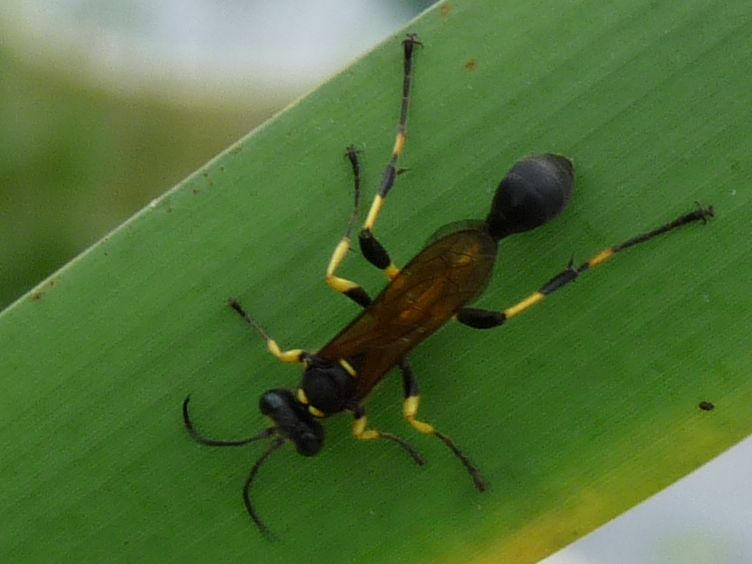
S. (Sceliphron) madraspatanum kohli in Japan.

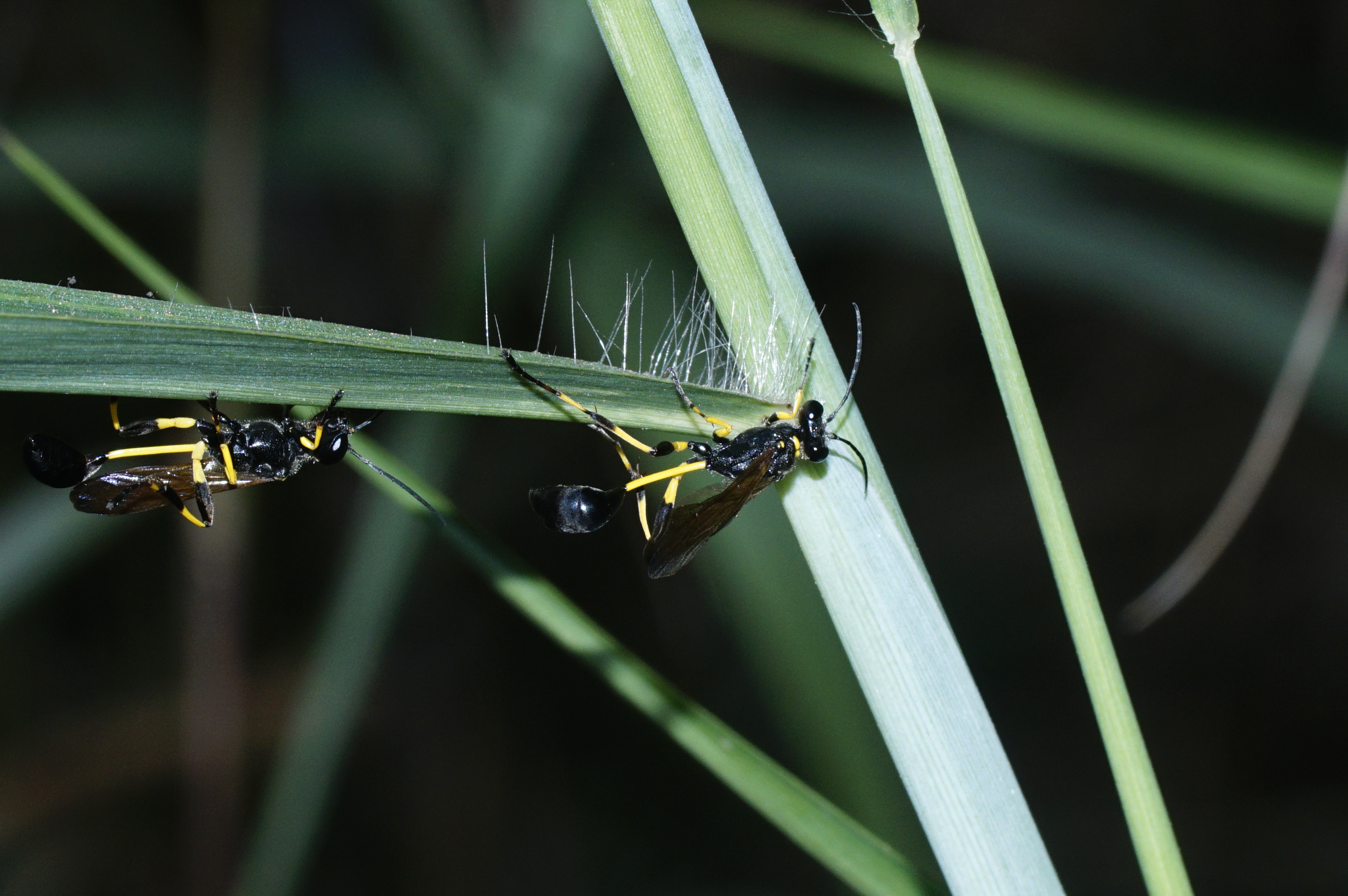
S. (Sceliphron) madraspatanum madraspatanum in India.

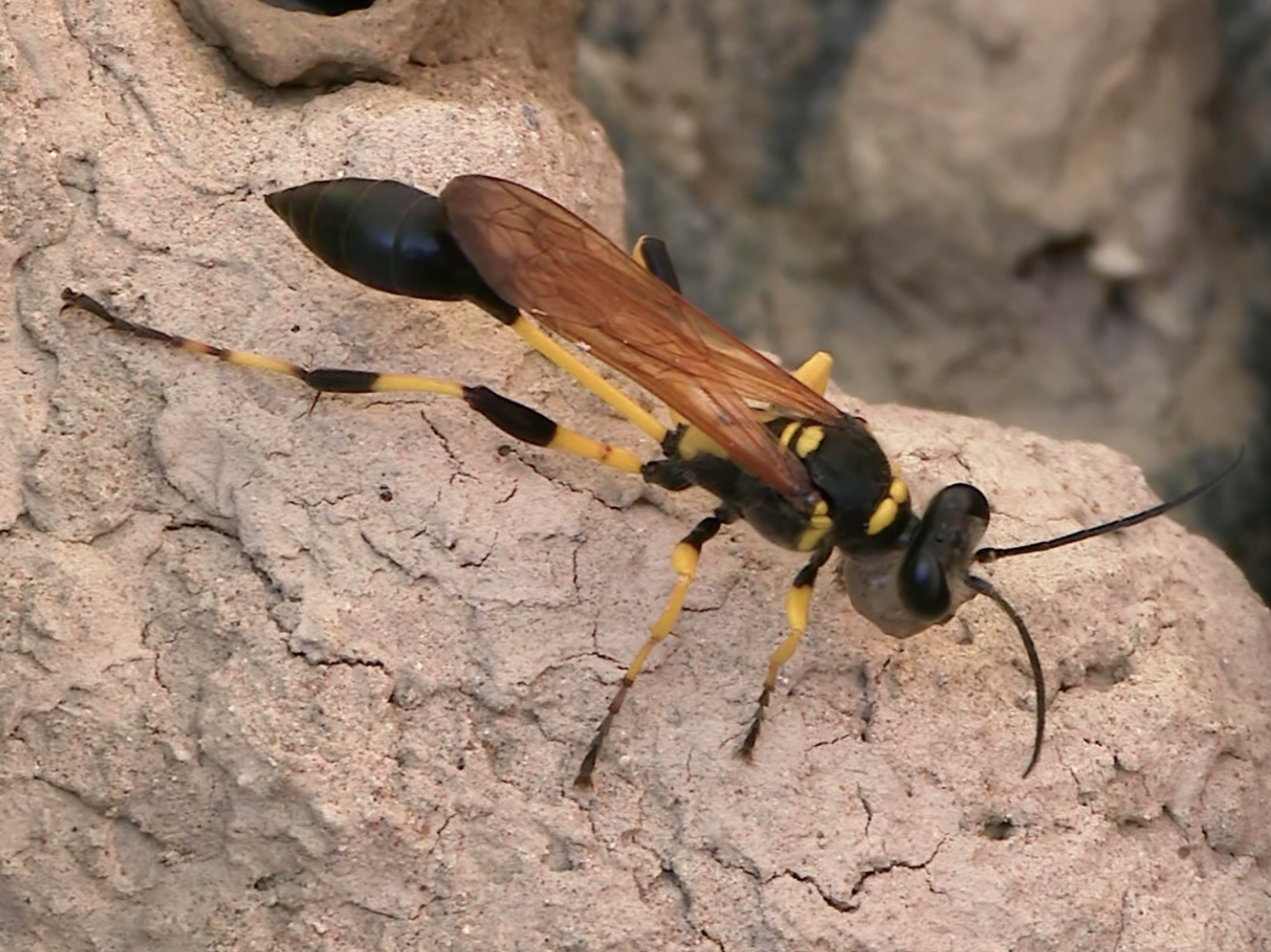
S. (Sceliphron) madraspatanum pictum in the UAE.

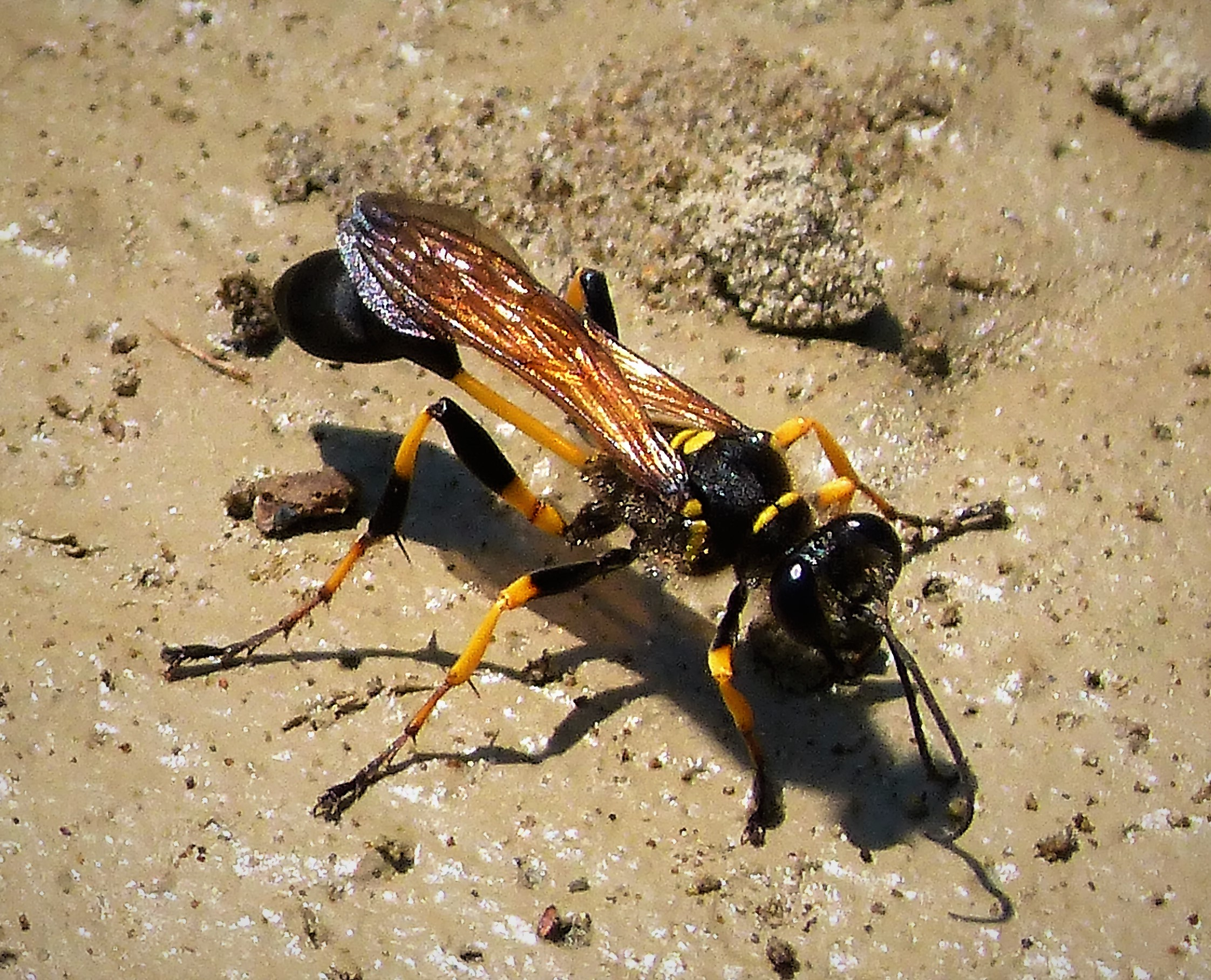
S. (Sceliphron) madraspatanum tubifex in Albania.

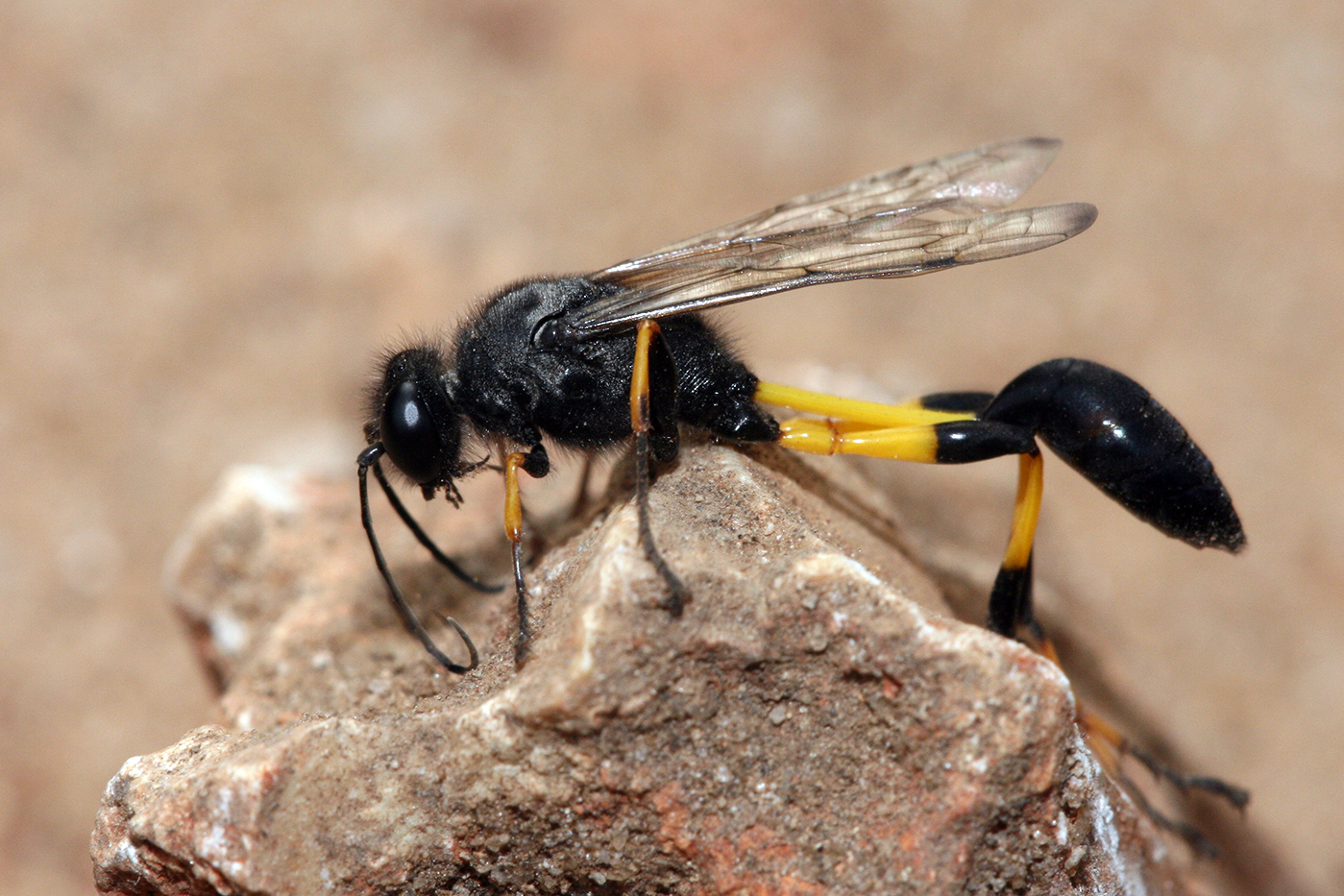
S. (Sceliphron) spirifex in Tanzania

== See also ==
- Blue mud-dauber wasps (Chalybion)
- Organ pipe mud dauber (Trypoxylon politum)
