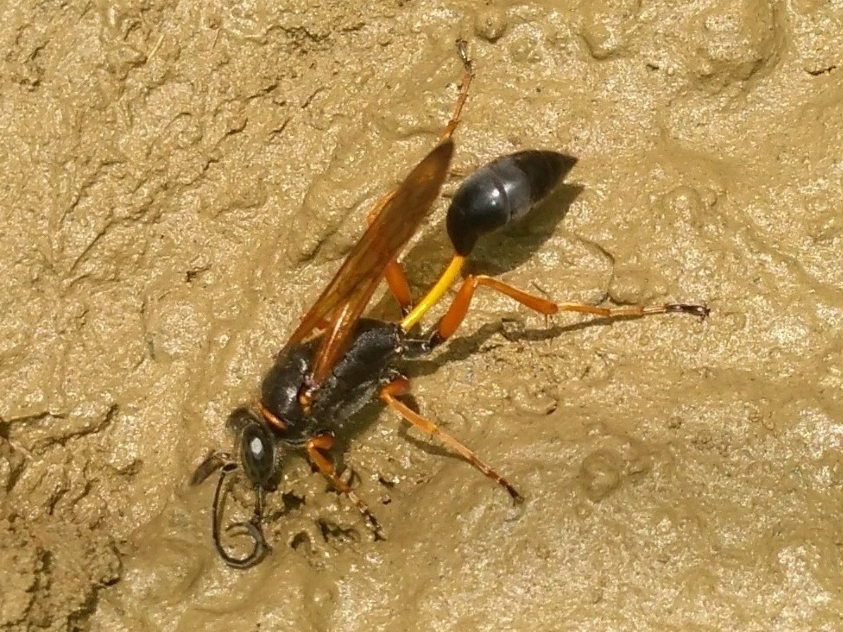

Scientific classification
- Kingdom: Animalia
- Phylum: Arthropoda
- Clade: Pancrustacea
- Class: Insecta
- Order: Hymenoptera
- Family: Sphecidae
- Tribe: Sceliphrini
- Genus: Sceliphron
- Species: S. coromandelicum

Binomial name
- Sceliphron coromandelicum (Lepeletier de Saint Fargeau, 1845)

Synonyms
- Ammophila coromandelica(Casolari and Casolari Moreno, 1980); Pelopaeus coromandelicus Lepeletier de Saint Fargeau, 1845

= Sceliphron coromandelicum =

Species of insect

Sceliphron coromandelicum is a species of solitary mud dauber wasp in the family Sphecidae. The female holotype was collected in Coromandel Coast, India.

== Ecology ==
The females constructs mud nests which she provisions with spiders as a food source for the enclosed immatures. The spiders are generally Araneidae and in some cases terricolous Salticidae.
