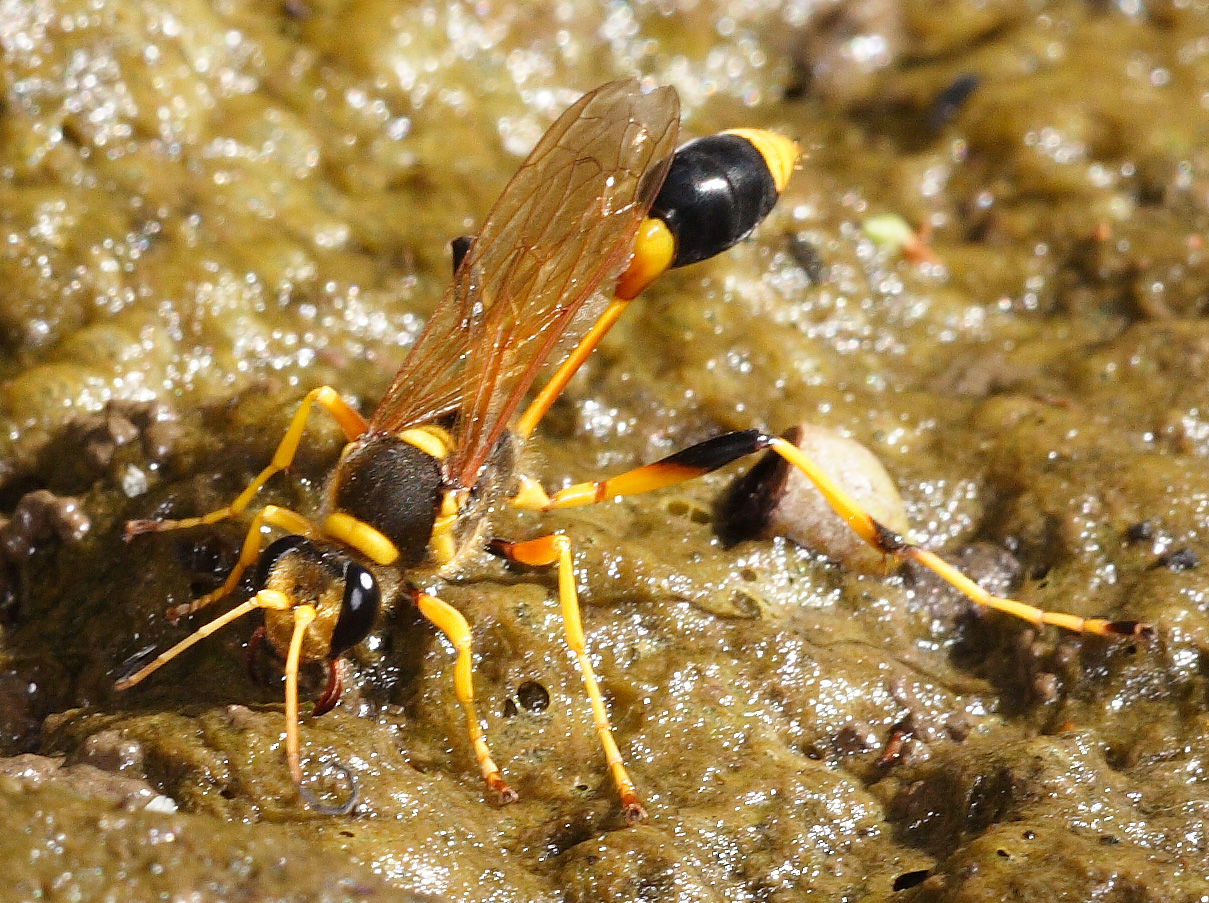

Scientific classification
- Kingdom: Animalia
- Phylum: Arthropoda
- Clade: Pancrustacea
- Class: Insecta
- Order: Hymenoptera
- Family: Sphecidae
- Tribe: Sceliphrini
- Genus: Sceliphron
- Species: S. laetum

Binomial name
- Sceliphron laetum F. Smith, 1856

= Sceliphron laetum =

Genus of wasps

Sceliphron laetum is a wasp in the family Sphecidae, the mud-dauber wasps. Like other members of this genus, it is a solitary species and builds cells out of mud in which to rear its young, provisioning them with paralysed spiders, and laying an egg in each. This wasp is native to Australia and southeastern Asia.

== Description ==
Like other members of the family Specidae, the first abdominal segment of S. laetum has been modified into an elongated, slender petiole. This wasp is 17 to 26 millimetres (0.67 to 1.02 in) long and is largely black, with bold yellow markings. It has membranous wings which fold over the body when at rest. Its head is clad with yellow hairs which thin out ventrally. It lacks an area of bare yellow skin on the lower part of the face which is present in the otherwise similar Sceliphron formosum. The thorax has one or more yellow patches dorsally between the wings. The hind tip of the thorax, the petiole and the front part of the gaster are yellow, the bulbous central portion of the gaster is black and its apex is yellow. The legs are yellow with some black markings.

== Distribution ==
Sceliphron laetum is native to most of Australia and parts of southeastern Asia including Papua New Guinea.

== Ecology ==
The female S. laetum builds a number of cylindrical cells out of mud. These are clustered together in a mass and when the nest is completed, extra mud is used to create ridges on the exterior. She then places the paralysed bodies of several spiders in the call, laying a single egg on the first spider. The female then seals the entrance with mud and proceeds to build, and provision, another cell. Her total fecundity is about eight eggs. Each larva will consume all the spiders in the cell and then pupate, finally emerging as an adult by chewing its way out of the cell.

This wasp most commonly selects orb-weaving spiders as prey, and it has been found that it is selective about the number and species of spiders used. The egg is frequently laid on a species of Argiope or Neoscona, but these spiders only constituted a small percentage of the total prey collected. The spiny orb-weaver (Gasteracantha) was the most frequently used spider in the later stages of provisioning the cell, but the egg was seldom laid on this species. The researchers hypothesized that the egg was laid on a comparatively soft-bodied species and that the tough spiny abdomen of Gasteracantha would be difficult for an early instar wasp larva to tackle.

The number of spiders per cell varied from three to nine, the wasp adjusting the total number according to their cumulative mass rather than their total volume. Wasps determine the sex of their offspring when they lay the egg. Male wasps in this species are smaller than females, but it was not apparent that eggs that would develop into males had smaller food caches.
