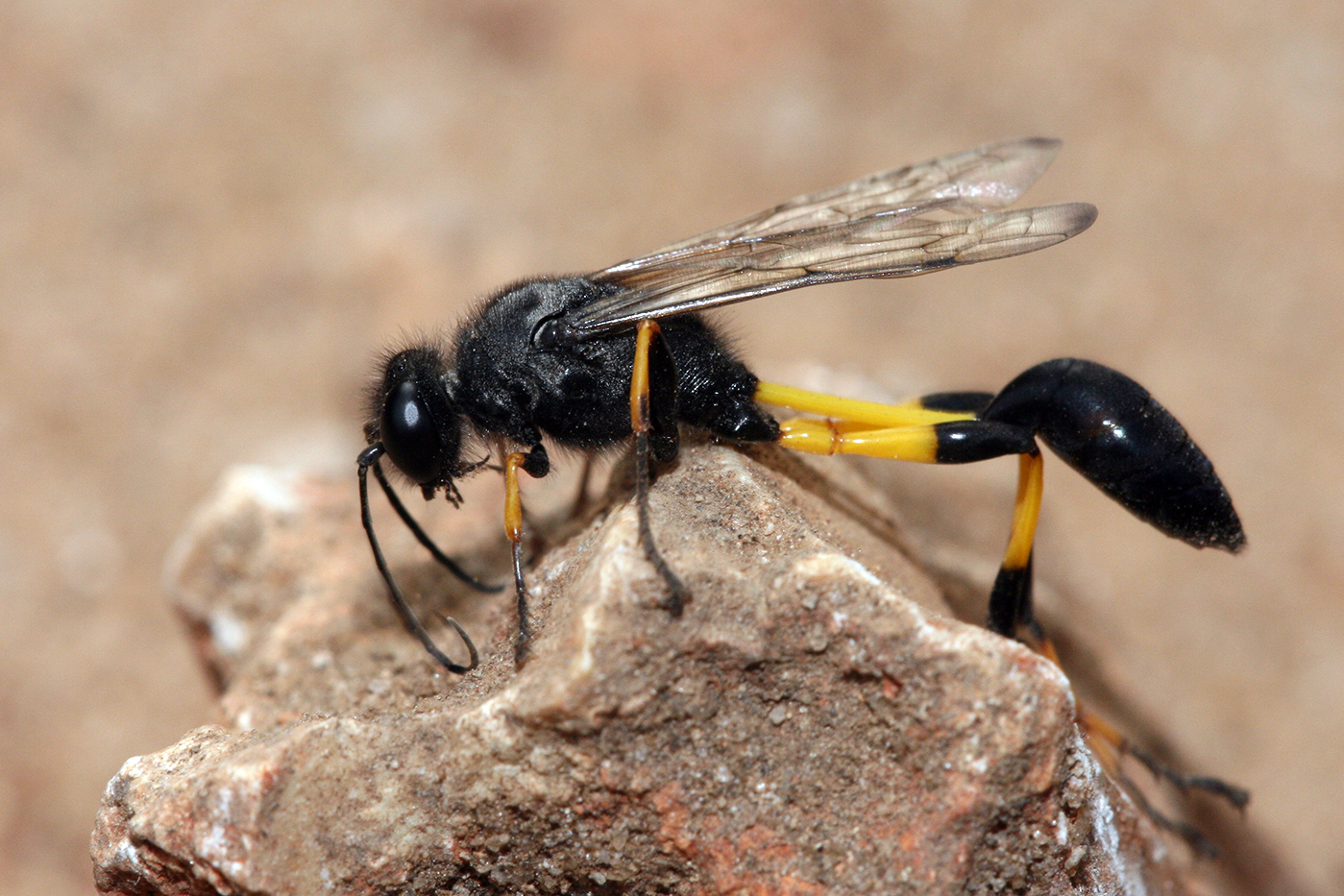
- S. spirifex in Tanzania

Scientific classification
- Kingdom: Animalia
- Phylum: Arthropoda
- Clade: Pancrustacea
- Class: Insecta
- Order: Hymenoptera
- Family: Sphecidae
- Tribe: Sceliphrini
- Genus: Sceliphron
- Species: S. spirifex

Binomial name
- Sceliphron spirifex (Linnaeus, 1758)
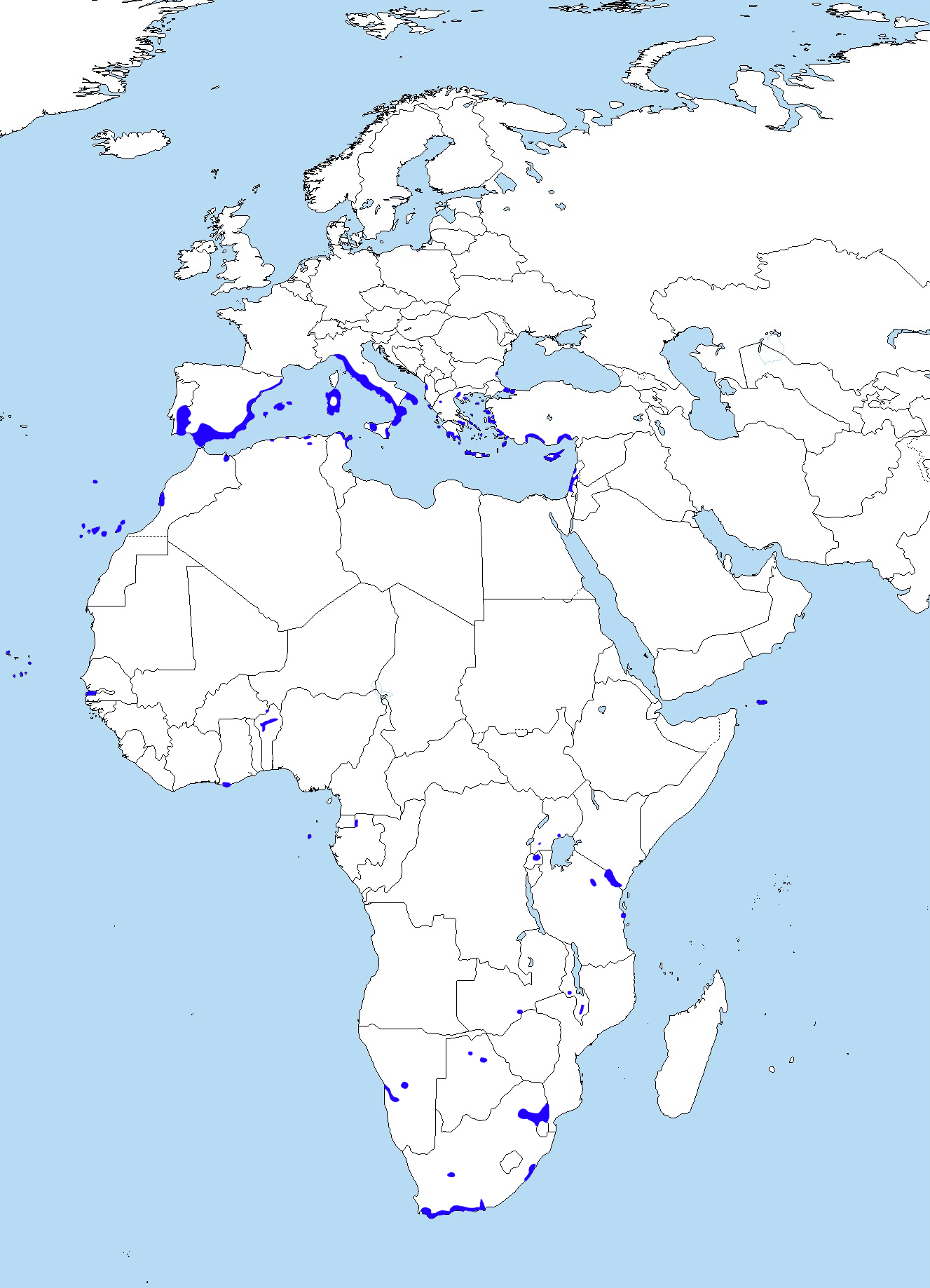

Synonyms
- Sphex spirifex Linnaeus, 1758; Sphex aegyptius Linnaeus, 1758; Pelopaeus spirifex (Linnaeus, 1758) - 1804; Sphex spirifex atra Scopoli, 1786; Sphex flavipes Christ, 1791; Pelopaeus aegyptiacum Klug, 1801 - 1851; Trypoxylon spirifex (Linnaeus, 1758) - 1860; Pelopaeus aterrimus Marquet, 1875; Sceliphron aegyptiacum Klug, 1801 - 1903; Sceliphron spirifex var. aegyptiacum Dalla Torre, 1897

= Sceliphron spirifex =

Species of insect

Sceliphron spirifex is a species of sphecid wasp. It has a medium-sized body (17–27 millimetres or 0.7–1.1 inches), which is dull black with a long, yellow petiole (waist). The legs are black with yellow bands, the antennae are black and the wings are clear.

Females build large multi-celled mud nests attached to cliffs, rocks, tree trunks, bridges and buildings. The cells are mass-provisioned with several spiders and sealed with mud.

S. spirifex lives in diverse habitats across Africa and Southern Europe, but is strongly associated with buildings and other man-made structures.

== Gallery ==
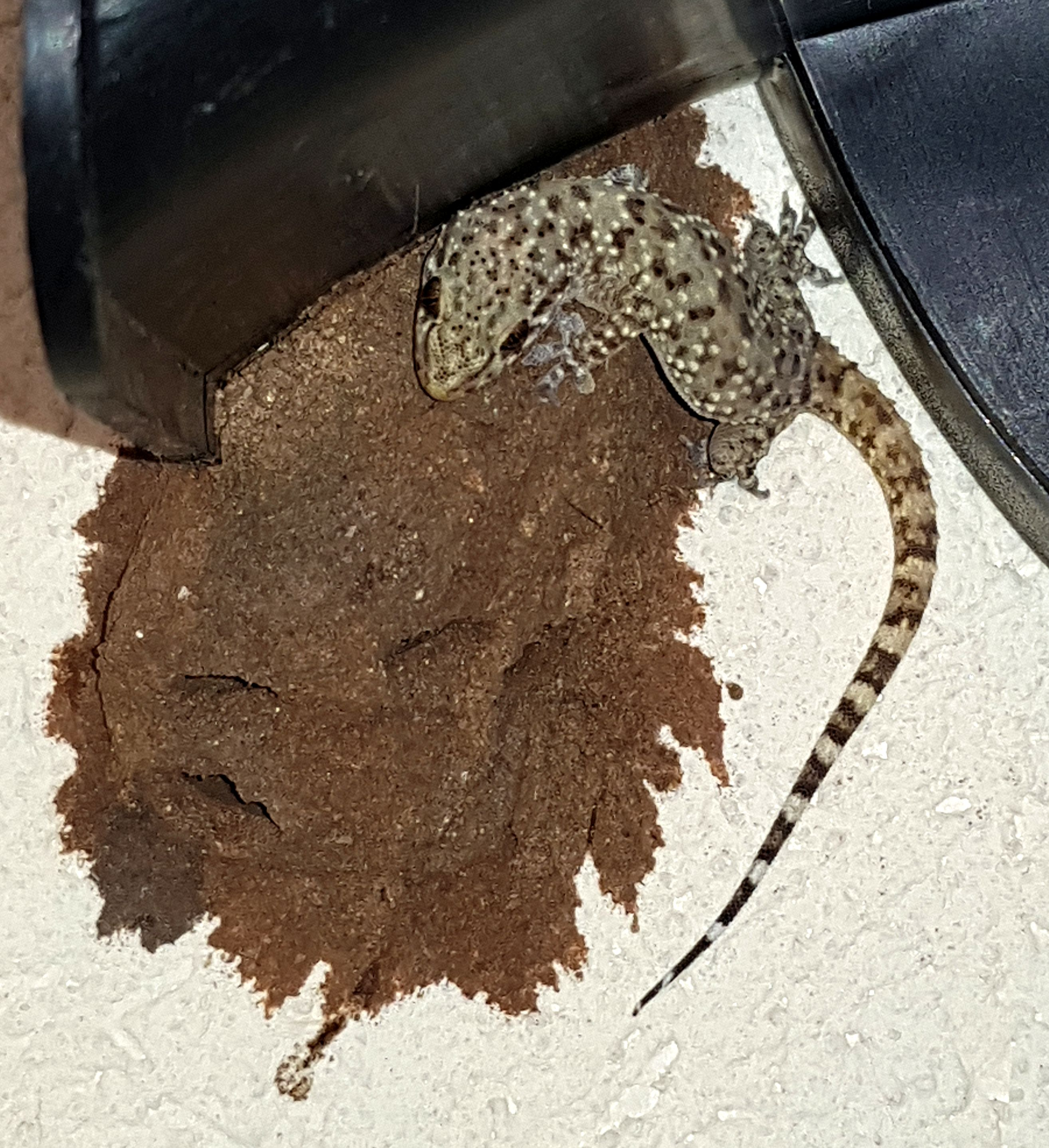
A Mediterranean house gecko in ambush on a nest of a Sceliphron spirifex.

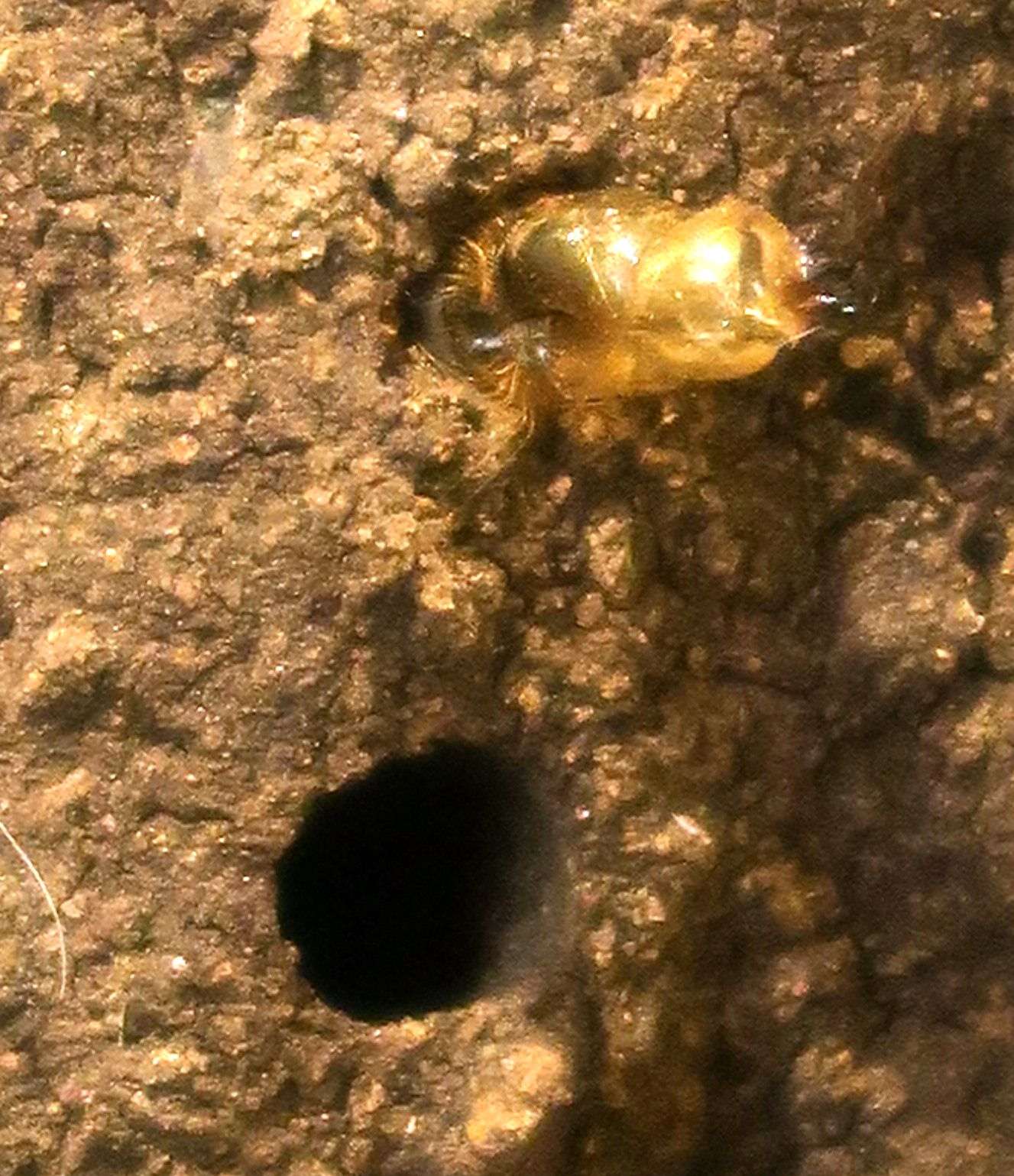
A Sceliphron spirifex offspring emerges from the nest.

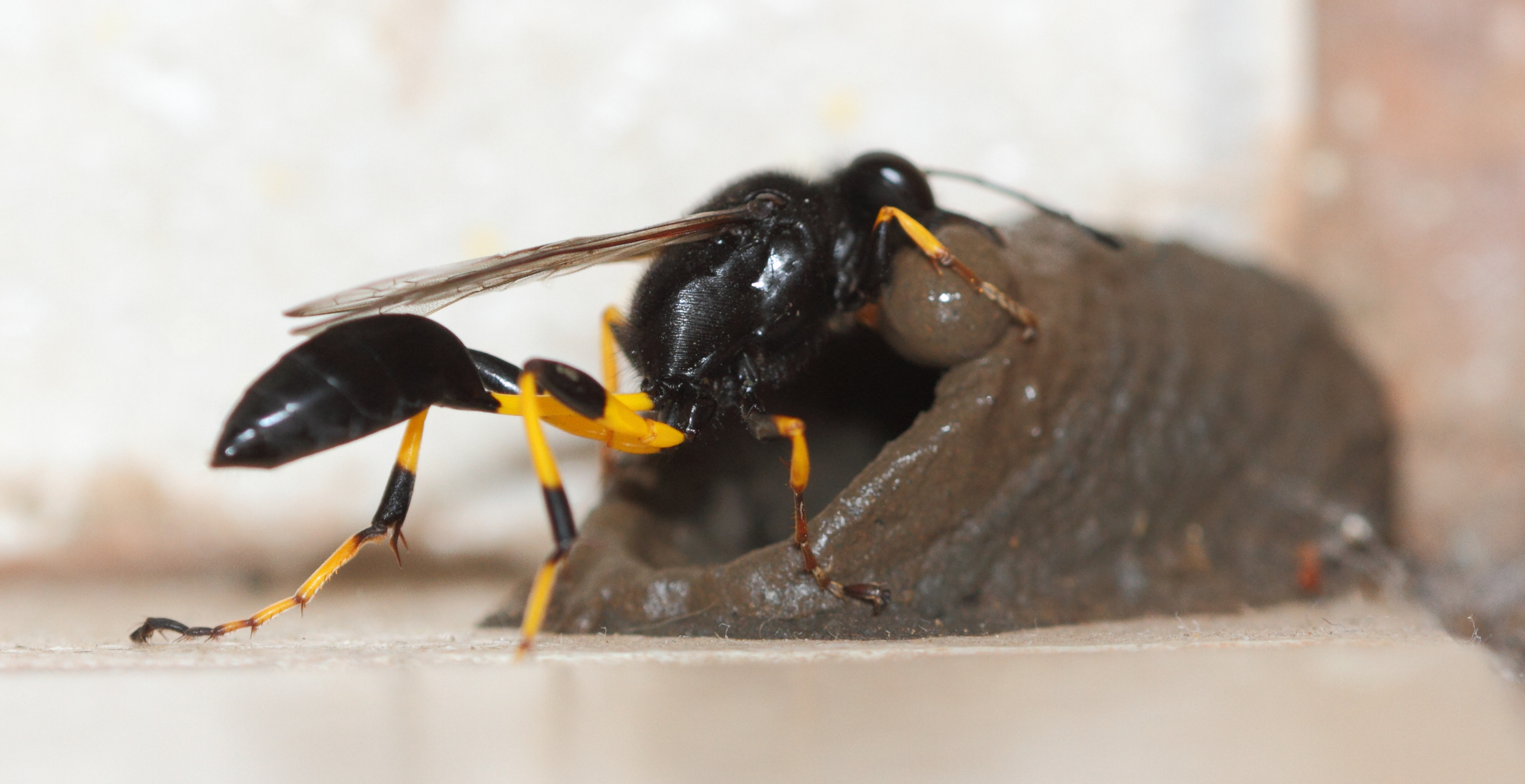
A Sceliphron spirifex female building a nest.
