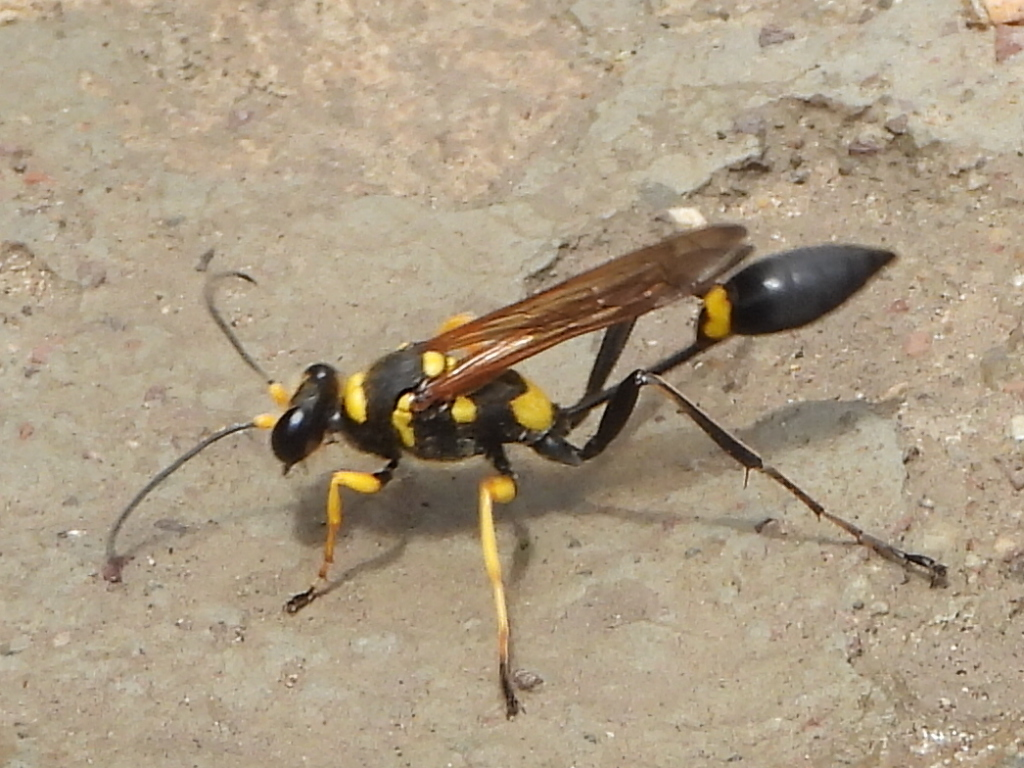

Scientific classification
- Kingdom: Animalia
- Phylum: Arthropoda
- Clade: Pancrustacea
- Class: Insecta
- Order: Hymenoptera
- Family: Sphecidae
- Tribe: Sceliphrini
- Genus: Sceliphron
- Species: S. assimile

Binomial name
- Sceliphron assimile (Dahlbom, 1843)

Synonyms
- Pelopaeus assimilis Dahlbom, 1843; Sceliphron caementarium nicaraguanum Kohl, 1918

= Sceliphron assimile =

Species of wasp

Sceliphron assimile, also known as Clayman's mud-dauber wasp, is a species of thread-waisted wasp in the family Sphecidae.
