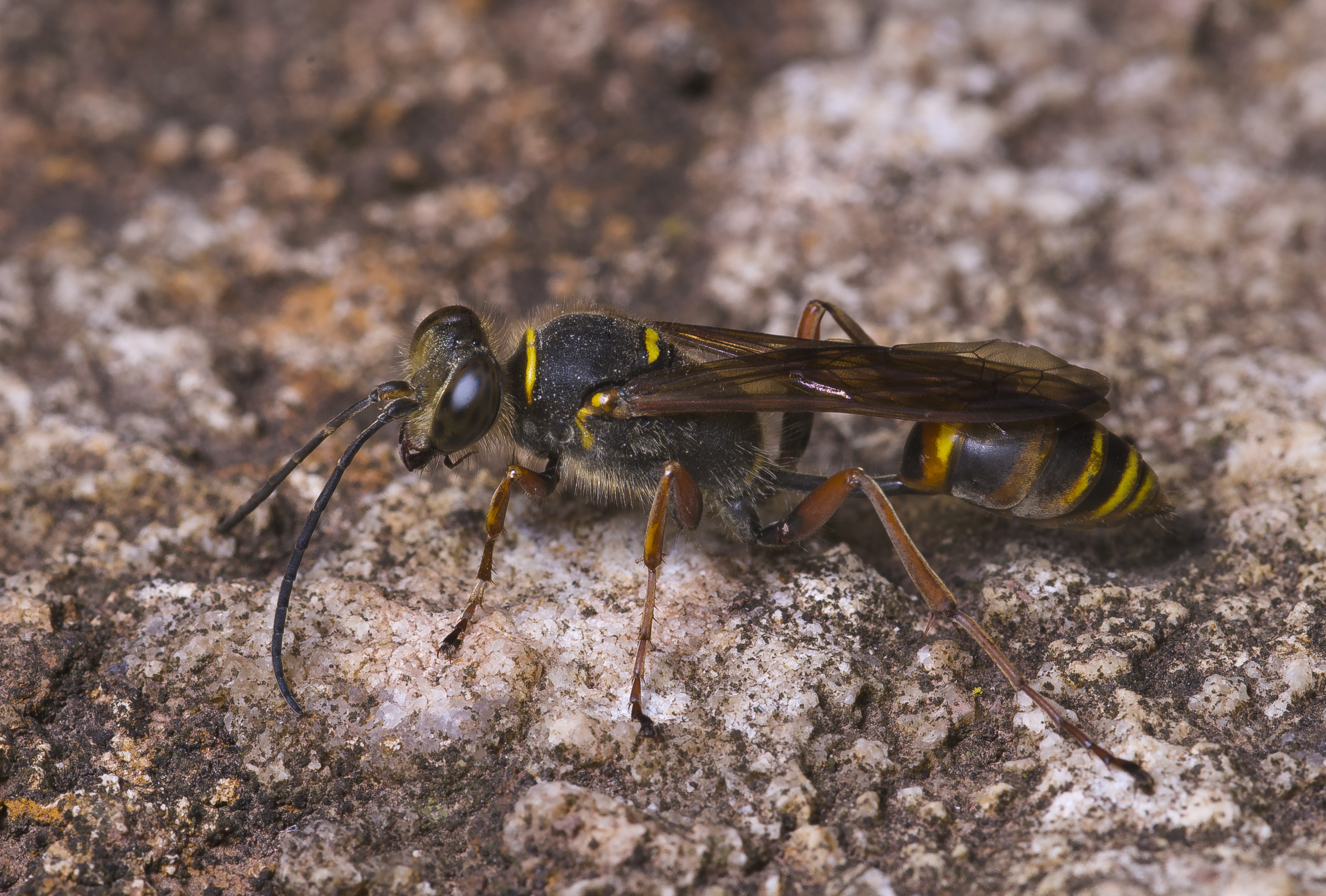
- Sceliphron curvatum

Scientific classification
- Kingdom: Animalia
- Phylum: Arthropoda
- Clade: Pancrustacea
- Class: Insecta
- Order: Hymenoptera
- Family: Sphecidae
- Tribe: Sceliphrini
- Genus: Sceliphron
- Species: S. curvatum

Binomial name
- Sceliphron curvatum (F. Smith, 1870)

= Sceliphron curvatum =

Species of wasp

Sceliphron curvatum, commonly known as the Asian mud-dauber wasp, is an insect in the genus Sceliphron of the wasp family Sphecidae. Like all wasps of this genus, it is a solitary species and builds nests out of mud. S. curvatum is native to some regions of Asia and invasive to Europe.

== Description ==
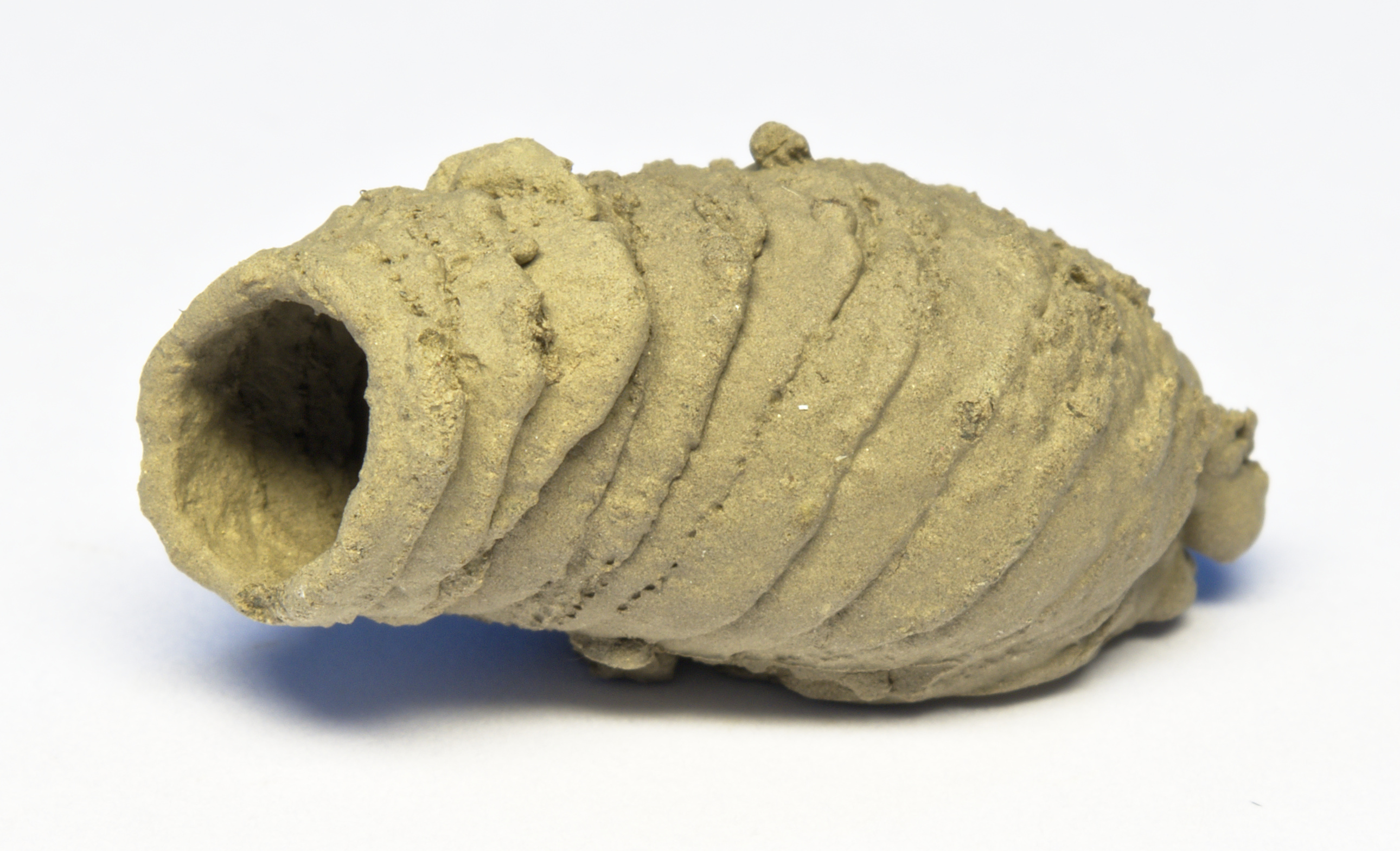
Nest of mud ready to be filled with spiders.

Sceliphron curvatum has a length of 15 to 25 millimetres (0.6 to 1.0 in) and is coloured black with yellow and red ornaments. It builds nests of mud on the walls of buildings, but also very often indoors on piles of books, clothes or pieces of furniture. Every nest is filled with paralyzed spiders, which serve as food for the larvae. Like all Sceliphron species, S. curvatum is not aggressive unless threatened.

== Distribution ==
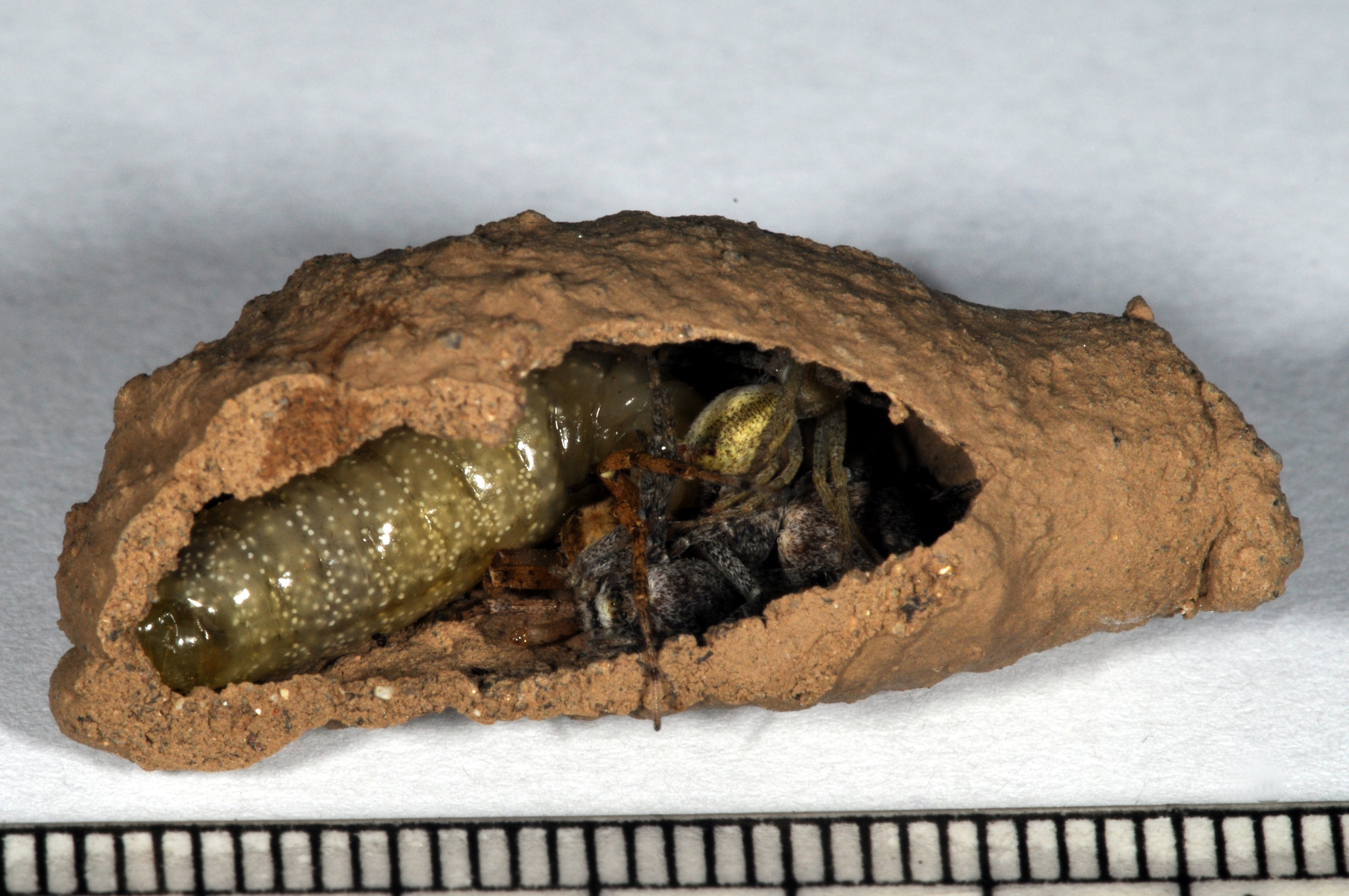
Larva and spiders in the nest of S. curvatum

Formerly, the species was distributed in India, Nepal, Pakistan, Kazakhstan and Tajikistan in submontaneous regions at the highest mountain ranges of the world: Himalayas, Karakoram and Pamir. It was first recorded in Europe in 1979, when a female was collected near the village of Grätsch in southeastern Austria. It is assumed that S. curvatum was introduced to Europe as a result of human activity, but after that the species has been spreading throughout Europe on its own. S. curvatum has been quickly enlarging its range, forming mighty populations in anthropogenous localities (towns, villages) in southern and central Europe. Since 1979 the species has expanded to several other European countries: Slovenia, Italy, Croatia, Switzerland, France, Hungary, Germany, Serbia, Montenegro, Greece, Czech Republic, Spain, Slovakia, Ukraine, Portugal, Poland, Romania, Belgium, Bulgaria, Cyprus, Luxembourg.

It has spread to North America. It was first reported in 2013, and it has spread to several states.
