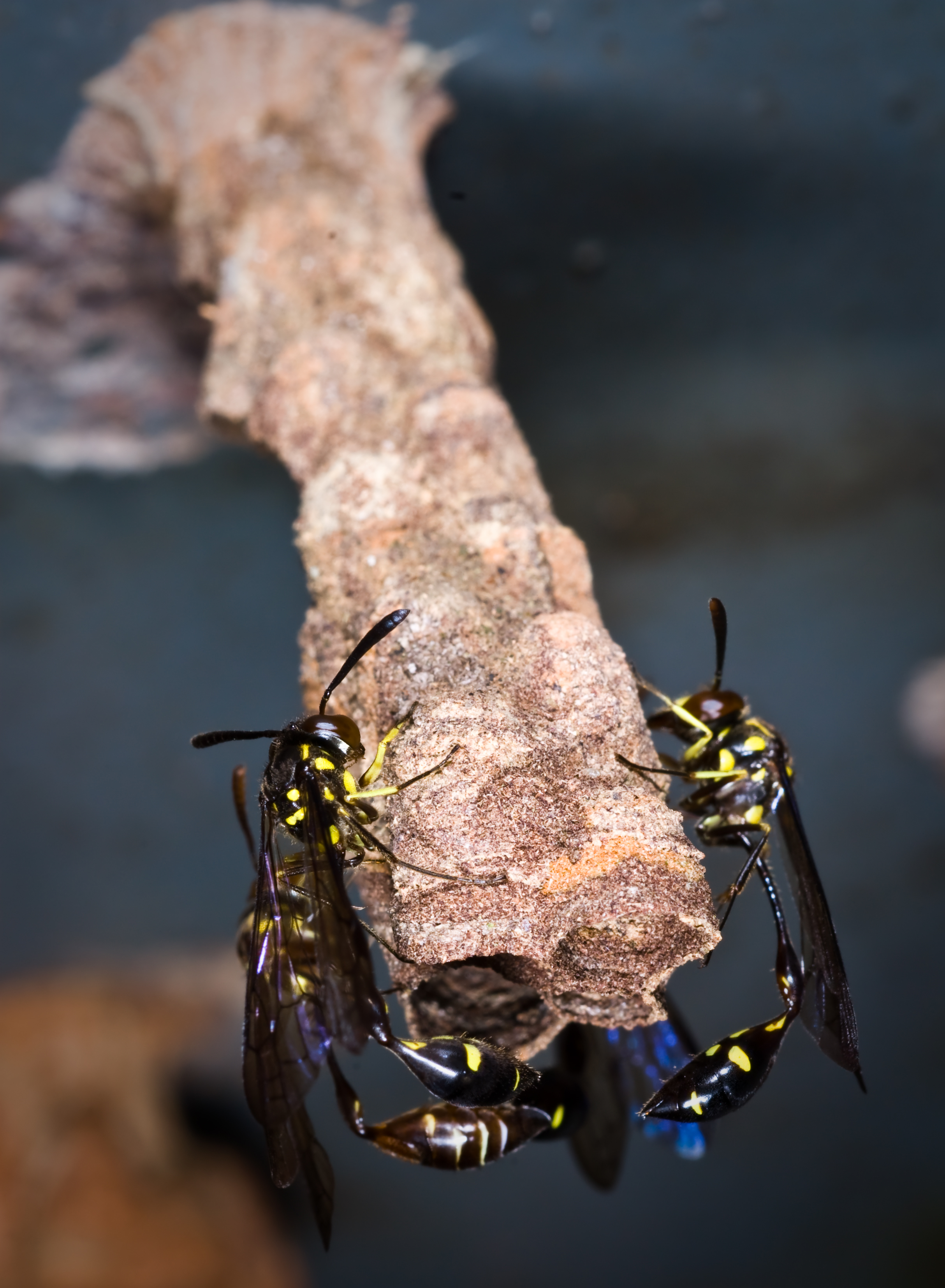

Scientific classification
- Kingdom: Animalia
- Phylum: Arthropoda
- Clade: Pancrustacea
- Class: Insecta
- Order: Hymenoptera
- Family: Vespidae
- Genus: Parischnogaster
- Species: P. alternata

Binomial name
- Parischnogaster alternata Sakagami , 1969

= Parischnogaster alternata =

Species of wasp

Parischnogaster alternata, the black hover wasp, is a eusocial wasp in the genus Parischnogaster. It is native to South-East Asia, and builds its nests in cavities located in dark and damp locations. The nests of black hover wasps are often found in clusters, which serves as a passive defense mechanism against predators. The annual colony cycle begins with nest initiation by a single foundress though colonies typically consist of 2-3 associative females and helpers that aid in brood development, nest construction, and colony defense. Indicative of the name, female P. alternata are known to strategically hover near nests when visiting other colonies before landing. These intrusions produce responses ranging from aerial fighting to cooperative food sharing.

== Taxonomy and phylogeny ==
Parischnogaster alternata was originally named by Shoichi Francisco Sakagami in 1969. P. alternata is one of ten species in the genus Parischnogaster. In current literature, P. alternata has been classified as potentially synonymous with another species, Parischnogaster timida discovered by Williams in 1928. These two synonymies may result in future renaming of the species. The closest relative is Parischnogaster striatula. In a phylogenetic classification study, P. striatula was misclassified for P. alternata suggesting close genetic relatedness. These two species are both a part of the striatula-group due to shared descriptive characteristics such as the length and width of the petiole and the separation of the clypeus from the eye.

== Description and identification ==
The black hover wasp is characterized by their brown-black coloration. Similar to other species in the Stenogastrinae subfamily, P. alternata can be distinguished by their significantly narrow mandibles. Another descriptor is the long, pointed clypeus separate from the eye shared by Parischnogaster striatula.

== Distribution and habitat ==
The black hover wasps inhabit the tropical rain forests of two Southeast Asian countries: Malaysia (Sarawak and Sabah) and Singapore.

Parischnogaster alternata builds dense clusters of nests in dark, damp cavities including caves and man-made structures such as vaults under bridges, water pipes, and the ceilings of grottoes. The nests of P. alternata typically appear brown with grey and pale bands due to the use of mud and vegetables. The composite materials of the nests include a mixture of mud, sand, and plant hairs. The nests are cylindrical in shape with a size ranging from 1.5 cm in diameter and 6.5 cm in length. Similar to other species in the Stenogastrinae subfamily, the nests contain a low number of cells with a maximum of 35 total. There are two known types of nests based on location. The most common type is built on flat surfaces and the other type hangs from thread-like suspensions from ceilings.

== Colony cycle ==
Parischnogaster alternata colonies are small typically consisting of no more than 2-3 females. Unlike the annual colony cycles of temperate wasps like Polistes, nesting and initiation of a colony occurs throughout the year. Typically, a single foundress initiates the colony cycle by locating a suitable site and building a nest. The foundress will build cells within the nest and lay one egg in each. Once the eggs hatch, the foundress feeds the larvae. The time of brood development is currently unknown but likely averages between 44 and 53 days based on close relatives P. nigricans and P. mellyi respectively. Some nests contain 2 or more overlapping subgroups (eggs laid around the same time), indicating that the average reproductive span of the dominant female may be short. After developing into adults, the offspring may either leave the nest to build their own or stay behind to become helpers. Unrelated females may also join the nest at any time during the colony cycle but current nest mates may resist the joining of foreign females. Although some colonies consist of more than one female (usually a helper or relative), the production of offspring is nearly always the responsibility of the dominant female.

== Behavior ==
=== Co-foundress ===
Although one female typically dominates the reproduction on one colony, there is strong evidence for co-foundress behavior among P. alternata. Occasionally, the founding of new colonies occurs from the cooperation of two or females. The females stay on the nest for a good portion of the day but rarely interact. Both co-foundresses contribute to the construction of the nest and overall protection of the colony. Though the associated females share many responsibilities equally, there is evidence that female foundresses with larger ovaries spend more time off the nest, indicating some type of hierarchy based on reproductive ability. One advantage in associative nesting is increased offspring. The more foundresses present in a nest, the more cells and eggs are produced. Also, the presence of more than one female improves active defense of the nest.

=== Helpers ===
In P. alternata, some developed brood will stay behind to become helpers instead of finding their own nest. Through cooperation with relatives, species can enhance the local resources surrounding them by becoming helpers. The advantage of helpers increases on high quality territories. The helpers can contribute to the defense of the nest from predation or usurpation.

Unlike associate females or co-foundresses, helpers typically share genetic relatedness with the foundress. Female helpers indirectly obtain benefits in fitness because the reproductive duration of the foundress is relatively short. Thus, the line to become the next dominant is not long. Many female helpers possess fully developed ovaries and the ability to produce male and female offspring. This anatomical feature of helpers may be indicative of a selective trait for preparedness for when the current dominant female stops reproducing. Most females will become egg-layers whether on a new nest or their natal nest.

=== Intra-cluster flights ===
Visitations from members of other colonies occur frequently in P. alternata. A few known reasons for visitations can include becoming a new, often non-related helper, sharing of food, stealing eggs or abdominal substance, and feeding on drops of fluid on patches. When there are already a lot of female residents, the reaction of rejection increases. P. alternata females utilize different nest defense tactics against intruders such as Liostenogaster flavolineata. If the wasps suddenly land, the nest residents may leave and return after a few moments and fight who ever remains. Although some Steronigastrinae wasps partake in antennal combat, P. alternata rarely use this fighting method and instead initiate falling fights. By nesting in clusters, P. alternata improves the collective defense against predation or social parasitism.

=== Egg deposition ===
One of the most interesting behaviors of species of Parischnogaster is the egg deposition process. The ovipositing female uses an abdominal substance produced by herself to handle the egg. In the first stage, the wasp collects a patch of viscid abdominal substance in her mouth. The patch is then placed into the cell. In the second stage, the wasp bends her abdomen towards her mouth. As the egg emerges from the abdomen the female will grasp it with its mouthparts. The final stage consists of collecting another patch of abdominal substance to place on top of the egg in the cell. This process may have evolved for defense purposes. Since P. alternata typically take on flight as an active defense, this method helps the female save the egg they are laying if disturbed by an attack.

== Eusociality ==
The black hover wasp is a primitively eusocial species. The relatedness of individual colony members is comparative to other eusocial insects such as Polistes, bees, and the sphecid. The lack of genetic diversity indicates that some female offspring stay in the nests and continue using these old nesting sites throughout colony cycles and new generations. Due to the high risk of predation and environmental pressures, female offspring may have a better chance at reproduction by staying to help as opposed to independently founding their own site.

Another indicator of eusociality in P. alternata is the skewed sex ratio. Similar to other eusocial species with dominance hierarchies, P. alternata have female-biased sex ratios of up to 71% females in a colony. The female-biased sex ratio may be indicative of the fact that male offspring do not stay on their natal nests as long as females.

== Defense ==
=== Predation ===
Similar to other Stenogastrinae, the major predators of the black hover wasps are ants, ichneumon flies, and Vespa hornets, specifically Vespula tropica (which has also been found to be a major predator of a number of Parischnogaster species, such as Parischnogaster mellyi and Parischnogaster nigricans serrei). Hornets often visit the nests of P. alternata and extract pupae and large larvae. While the colonies are relatively small, the presence of helpers and co-foundresses contributes to active defense tactics. Females may attempt to attack hornets in flight by stinging. Through cooperative defense, some residents drive away the hornets while the wasps fall from the nest in order to save the adult individuals. Nonetheless, evolution has decreased active defense mechanisms of P. alternata. Thus, the attempts to attack predators often have little to no effect.

=== Nest mimicry ===
Due to the small colony sizes, P. alternata have limited capability to defend the nests. Thus, the black hover wasp construct nests in such a way to blend in with the forest vegetation. The camouflaged nests help reduce predation by serving as the major line of defense. The foundress responsible for making the nest searches for the materials and builds the nest, though some have already been built. The two major types of nests are the hanging nests and the flat-topped nests. The hanging nests are slender in shape in comparison to the flat-topped nests that are more stout and oval-shaped. The hanging nests provide a protective screen that potentially block predators. P. alternata utilize both organic and inorganic materials. The inorganic materials vary based on region but demonstrates the use of man-made materials. The organic composite materials of the nests include a mixture of mud, sand, and plant hairs. These materials contribute to the pale brown color of the nests allowing them to blend in with surrounding trees and plants.

=== Dilution effects in nest clustering ===
Seemingly working against efforts of mimicry, P. alternata often construct nests in clusters, which potentially attract attention due to size. Clusters are defined as the aggregation of a multitude of nests consisting of different colonies. Two majors reasons for clustering include reduced predation due to the dilution effect and improved hunting. Clustering can increase overall fitness of the colony because cooperation results in an increase in finding food. The dilution effect assumes that by aggregating in a larger group, the chances of predator attack are significantly reduced. In addition, the theory proposes that individuals will seek center positions in the group to further reduce their chances of attack. There is evidence that the core clusters of P. alternata nests often have greater visits from conspecifics and consequently greater defense. The central core comprises older nests surrounded by younger colonies. The more densely packed clusters attract more predation due to a decrease in conspicuity but the predation rate is lower. It is assumed that the advantages of passive protection from predation served as a major evolutionary factor that resulted in nest clusters in P. alternata.

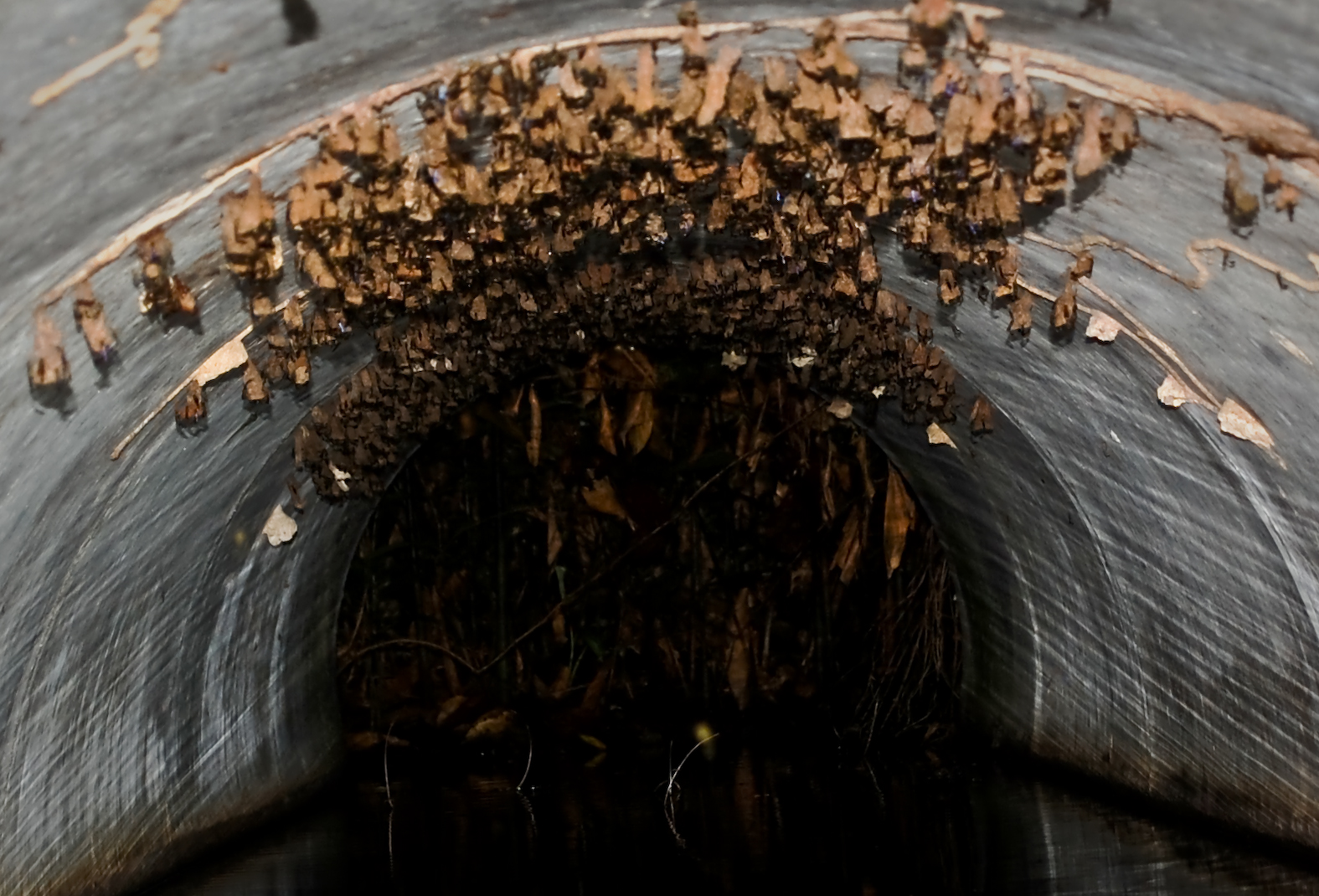
Cluster of Parischnogaster alternata nests
