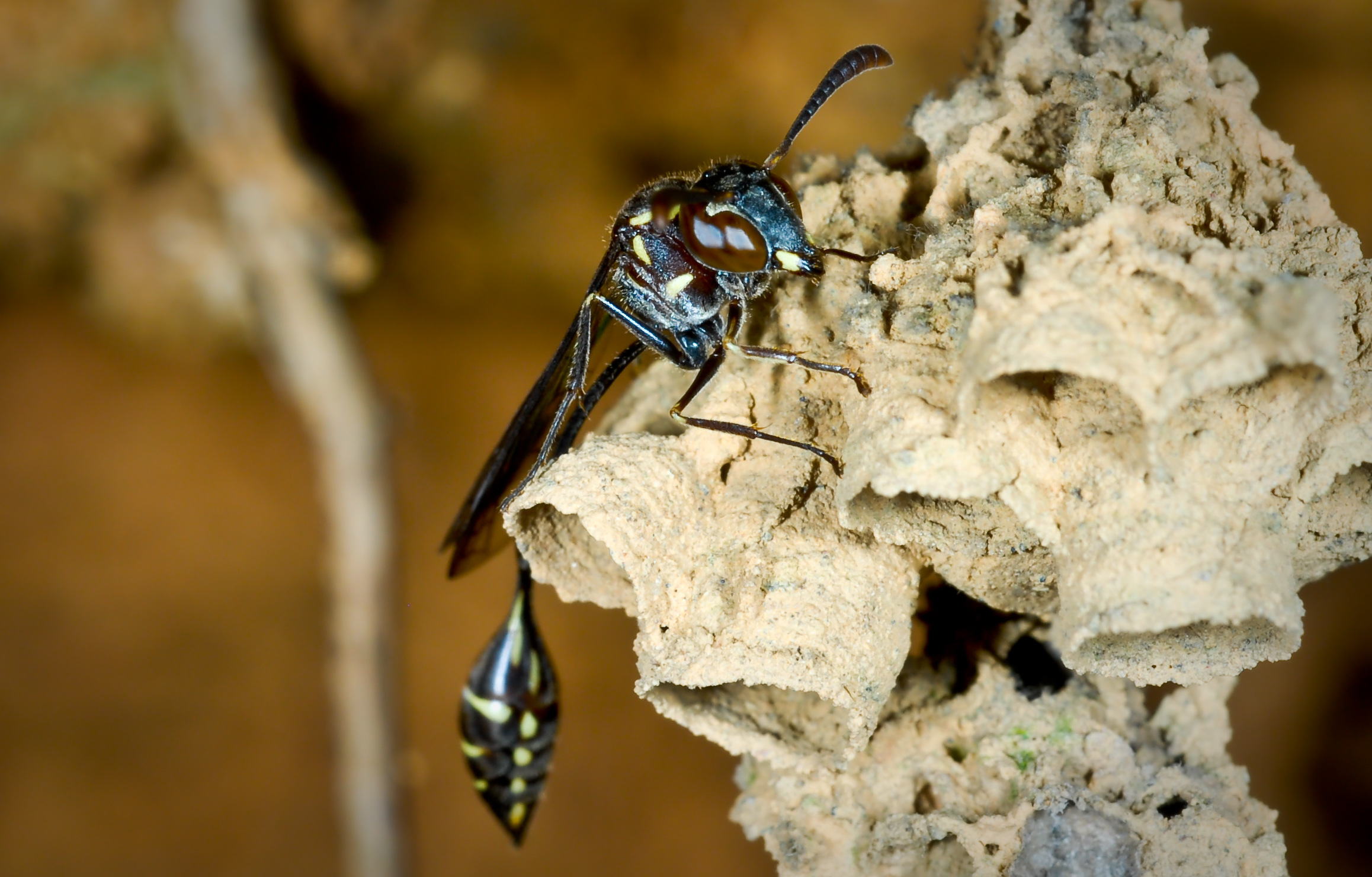
- Parischnogaster mellyi, Peninsular Malaysia

Scientific classification
- Kingdom: Animalia
- Phylum: Arthropoda
- Clade: Pancrustacea
- Class: Insecta
- Order: Hymenoptera
- Family: Vespidae
- Subfamily: Stenogastrinae
- Genus: Parischnogaster von Schulthess, 1914

Type species
- Ichmogaster mellyi de Saussure, 1852

Synonyms
- Holischnogaster Vecht, 1977

= Parischnogaster =

Genus of wasps

Parischnogaster is a genus of hover wasps from the subfamily Stenogastrinae, a subfamily of eusocial wasps endemic to the Oriental Region which are included in the family Vespidae.

== Species ==
The following species are some of those included within the genus Parischnogaster:

- Parischnogaster albofasciata Selis, 2018
- Parischnogaster alternata Sakag., 1969
- Parischnogaster aurifrons (Smith, 1862)
- Parischnogaster carpenteri Selis, 2018
- Parischnogaster curviclypeus Selis, 2018
- Parischnogaster depressigaster Rohwer, 1919
- Parischnogaster fei Selis, 2015
- Parischnogaster giglii Selis, 2015
- Parischnogaster gracilipes (Vecht, 1977)
- Parischnogaster jacobsoni (R. du Buysson, 1913)
- Parischnogaster mellyi (de Saussure, 1852)
- Parischnogaster mindanaonis Selis, 2018
- Parischnogaster nigerrima Selis, 2018
- Parischnogaster nigricans (Cameron, 1902)
  - Parischnogaster nigricans serrei (R. du Buysson, 1905)
- Parischnogaster nigriterga Selis, 2018
- Parischnogaster simillima Selis, 2018
- Parischnogaster striatula (R. du Buysson, 1905)
- Parischnogaster timida (Williams, 1928)
- Parischnogaster unicuspata Reyes, 1988
