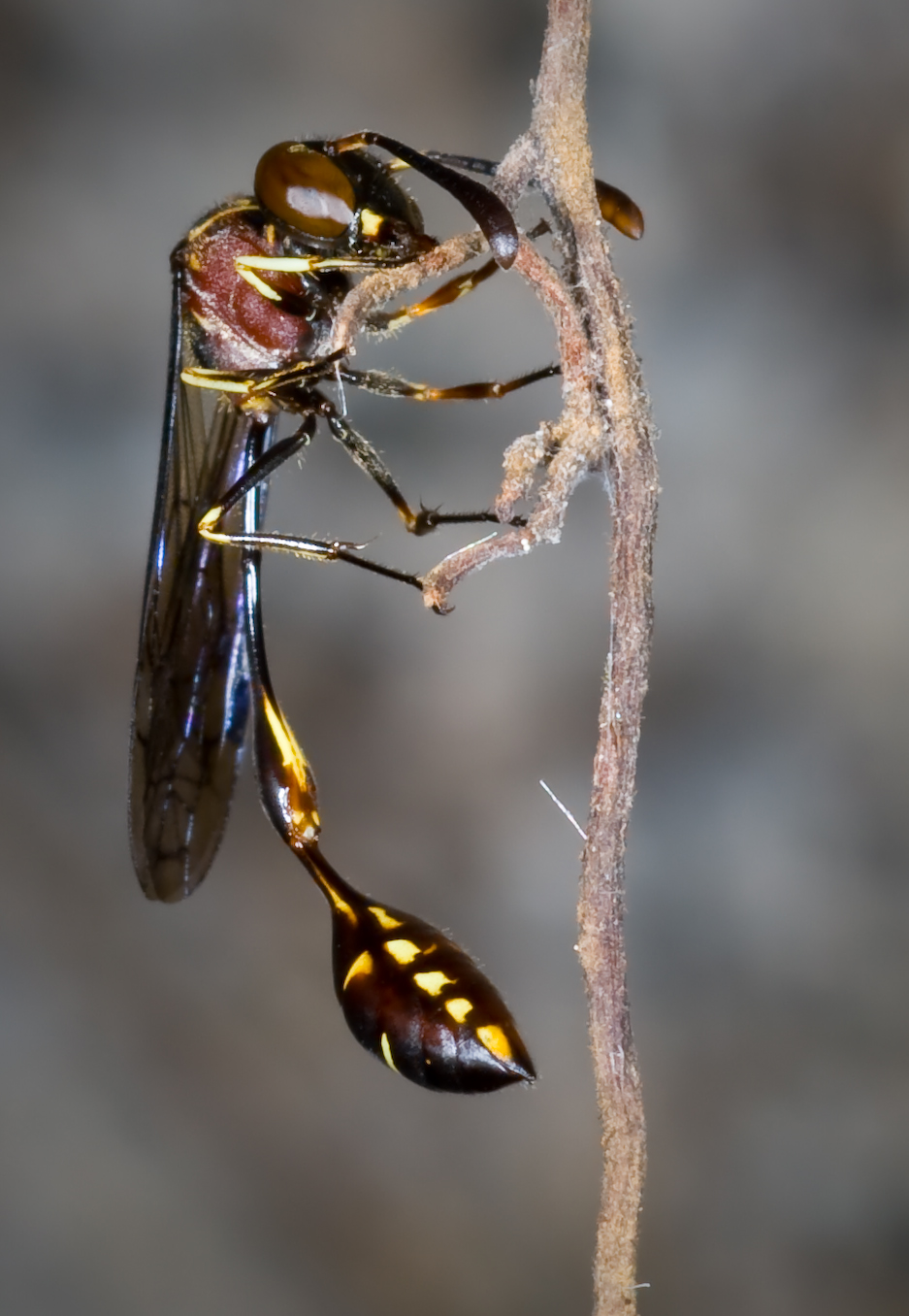
- Female from Peninsular Malaysia

Scientific classification
- Kingdom: Animalia
- Phylum: Arthropoda
- Clade: Pancrustacea
- Class: Insecta
- Order: Hymenoptera
- Family: Vespidae
- Genus: Parischnogaster
- Species: P. mellyi

Binomial name
- Parischnogaster mellyi (De Saussure, 1852)

Synonyms
- Ischnogaster mellyi de Saussure, 1852; Ischnogaster nigrifrons Smith, 1857; Stenogaster nigrifrons (Smith, 1857); Parischnogaster nigrifrons (Smith, 1857); Stenogaster mellyi (de Saussure, 1852)

= Parischnogaster mellyi =

Species of wasp

Parischnogaster mellyi is a medium-sized species of a hover wasp in the family Vespidae. It is found in Southeast Asia and is widely spread in Thailand and Malaysia. Its nests feature flexible and dynamic qualities, and they are commonly seen under roofs of houses and huts in rural areas. Hovering and patrolling behaviors are the species’ main defining behavioral features, and such activities are closely linked to its mating patterns.

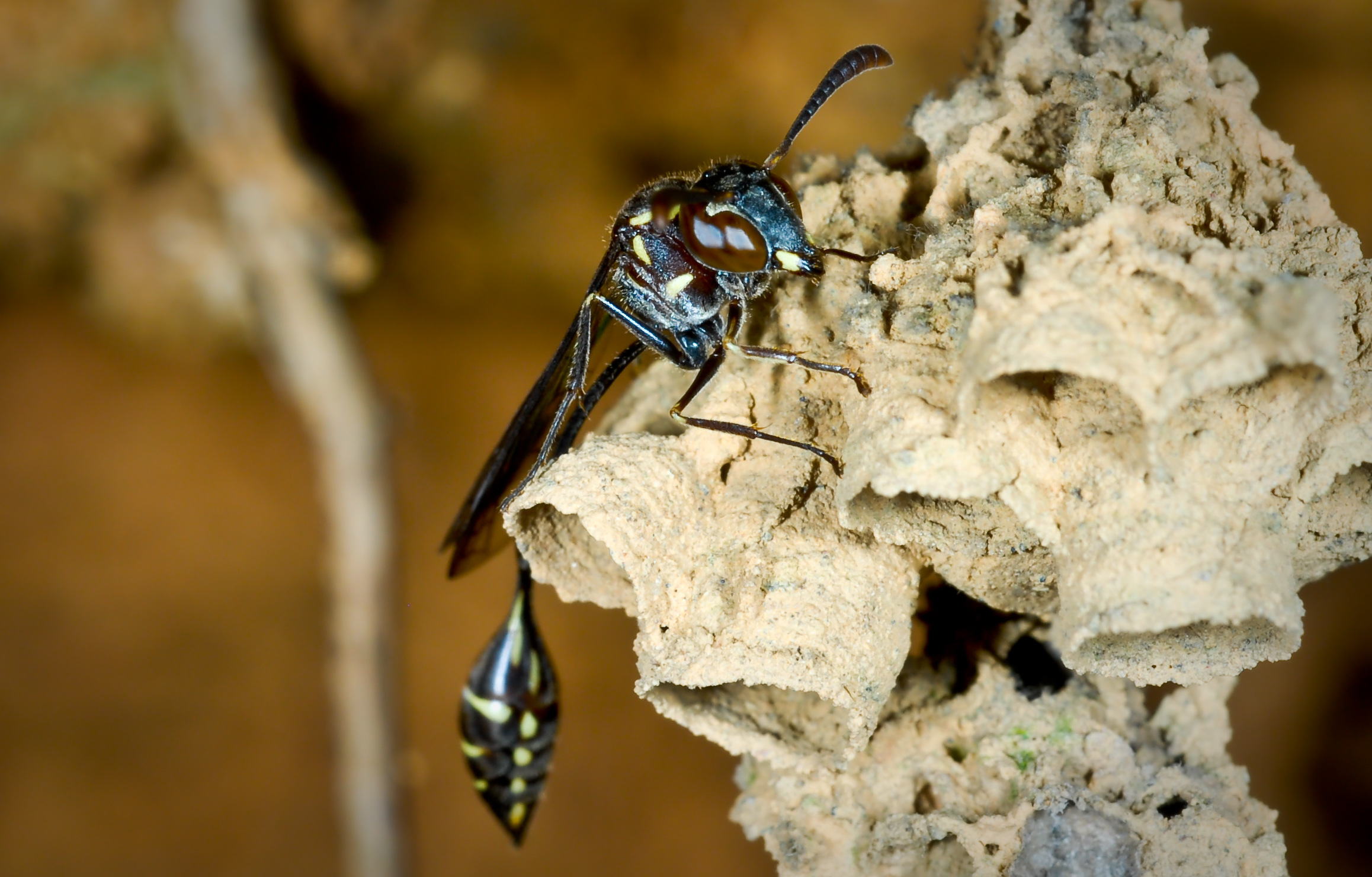
Parischnogaster mellyi. Peninsular Malaysia

== Taxonomy and phylogeny ==
All hover wasp species were placed under one genus, Stenogaster, until 1927, when von Schulthess created the new genus, Parischnogaster, for species populated in Asia. Parischnogaster was synonymized with Holischnogaster by Carpenter in 1982, and it is possibly the largest and the least well known genus.

P. mellyi was first found by De Saussure in 1852. Understanding of phylogenetic background for P. mellyi is of particular importance because “the independence of origin and range of social organization in the Stenogastrinae make it an important group for the study of evolution of social behavior in the family Vespidae."

== Description and identification ==
=== Morphology ===
P. mellyi is considered a medium-sized wasp with an average length of 10mm. Its head is sub-triangular shaped with uniform facial coloration. It also has a well developed Dufour’s gland, which seems accountable for abundant abdominal secretion that plays an important role in egg development (see colony cycle for more detail). There are a number of morphological differences between gender: in terms of exocrine glands, tegumental glands in males are clustered along the anterior portion of the third gastral tergum, and ectal mandibular glands are three times wider and longer than those of females. Additionally, males have three white stripes on their tergites, while females do not carry such morphological features. There are no phenotypical differences between females of different social status.

=== Nesting ===
P. mellyi nests are known for their distinct combs at different levels of suspension. It builds nests with materials from three main sources: vegetation close to the nest, materials stolen from abandoned or occupied neighboring nests, and material removed from one cell, which is then used to start to enlarge a cell in the other part of the nest. Such recycling of the materials of the cells is frequently observed. A brand new cell is only built when there is no cell to shelter an anticipated egg. Material used for nest development has two important features: the cuticular cell layer of plants constitutes a substantial portion of the nest, and the texture of the nest material is of fine crumbs and small flakes. This kind of fragile aspect of the nest material might explain the low occurrence of large nests, and this may possibly hinder the evolution of large colony size. Its nesting structure is known for its flexibility, and thus lacks a typical shape or form. First off, cells modify its size with the changing size of the larva as it grows: the cell goes through a phase of regression until the cell size is equivalent to that of the growing larva. Then, both the larva and the cell starts to grow again in a similar fashion. Additionally, there is a general trend of decrease percent cell wall sharing with increase in suspension length. Typically, the nests are located on the strands of dead vegetation such as hanging vine tendrils or loose strands of thatch under the roofs of houses. The mean total suspension length of these nests is 18.4 cm and the mean suspension width is 0.64mm. The long and narrow shape of the nest also provides protection from predators.

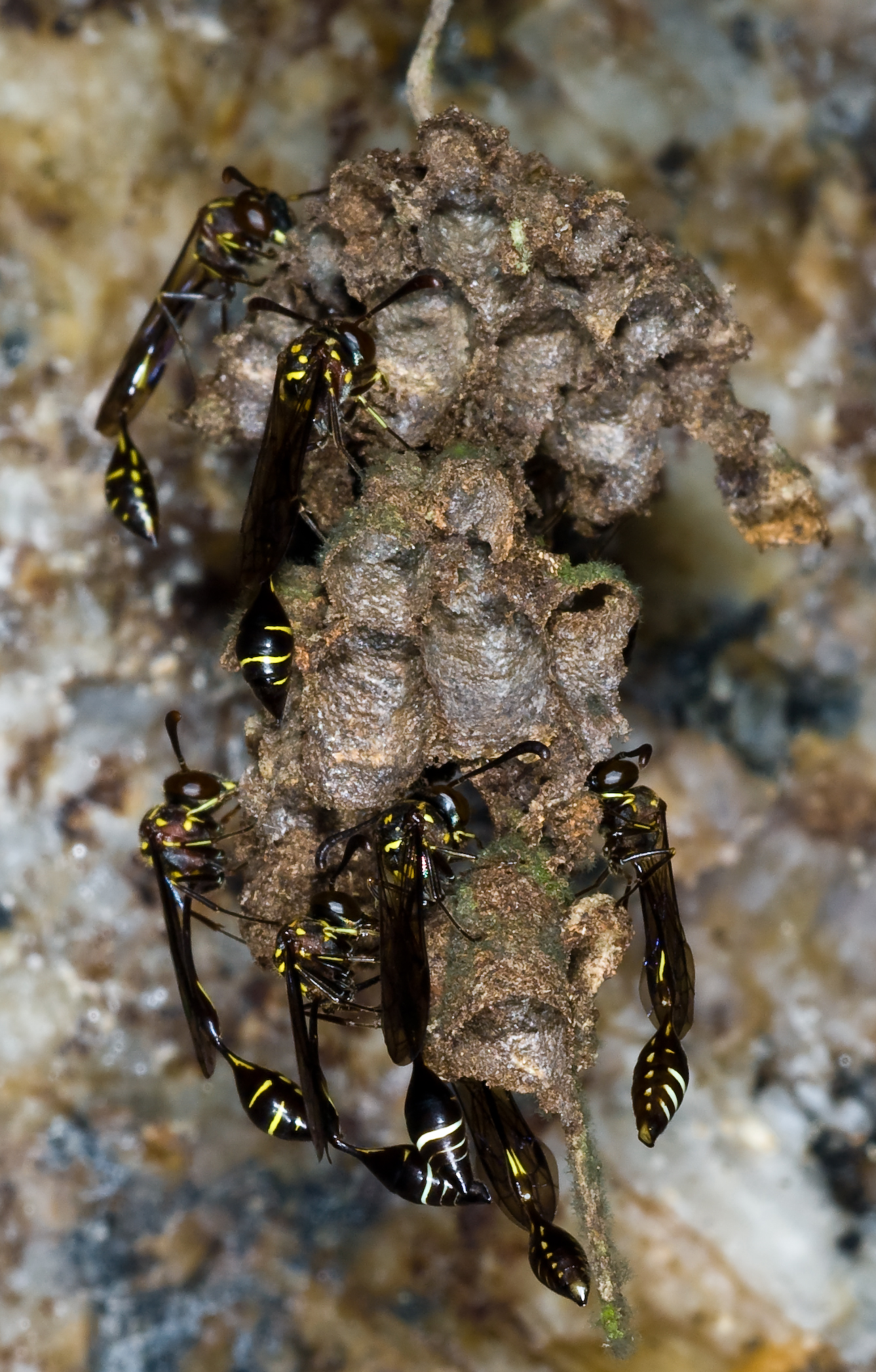
big nest of Parischnogaster mellyi. Three females above and three males below. Peninsular Malaysia.

== Distribution and habitat ==
P. mellyi has been identified in Thailand and Malaysia, and it is commonly found near forest edge habitats. It often constructs its nests under the roofs of thatched huts and houses in rural areas. Such habitat choice is unique to P. mellyi, since Stenogastrinae species population is rarely found in places disturbed by human contact and civilization.

== Colony cycle ==
All colonies of P. mellyi are founded by a single female and expand with the emergence of sons and daughters. The typical colony size is one female (i.e. no male), and it rarely exceeds three females, while the maximum number of males present in a nest is four. Nests are actively defended against strange females approaching or landing on a nest. Median survival time of a typical colony is 47 days, and the longest surviving nest is recorded to be 237 days before it died out.

The average length of P. mellyi developmental period is around 53 days. The three developmental stages are: egg phase (a one-day period between egg laying to hatching, where the egg is placed with the mouthparts), larval phase (approximately a 25.71-day period between egg laying to pupation), and pupal phase (a 17.8-day period between the capping of the cell and the emergence of the adult). White sticky abdominal droplets are secreted from Dufour’s gland during egg laying. These droplets play an important role in development stages, since in the form of these white abdominal secretions do the eggs receive attention from adult females. However, wasps of P. mellyi produce less rich secretions from their Dufour's glands than wasps of P. jacobsoni, and thus do not produce ant guards using this secretion.

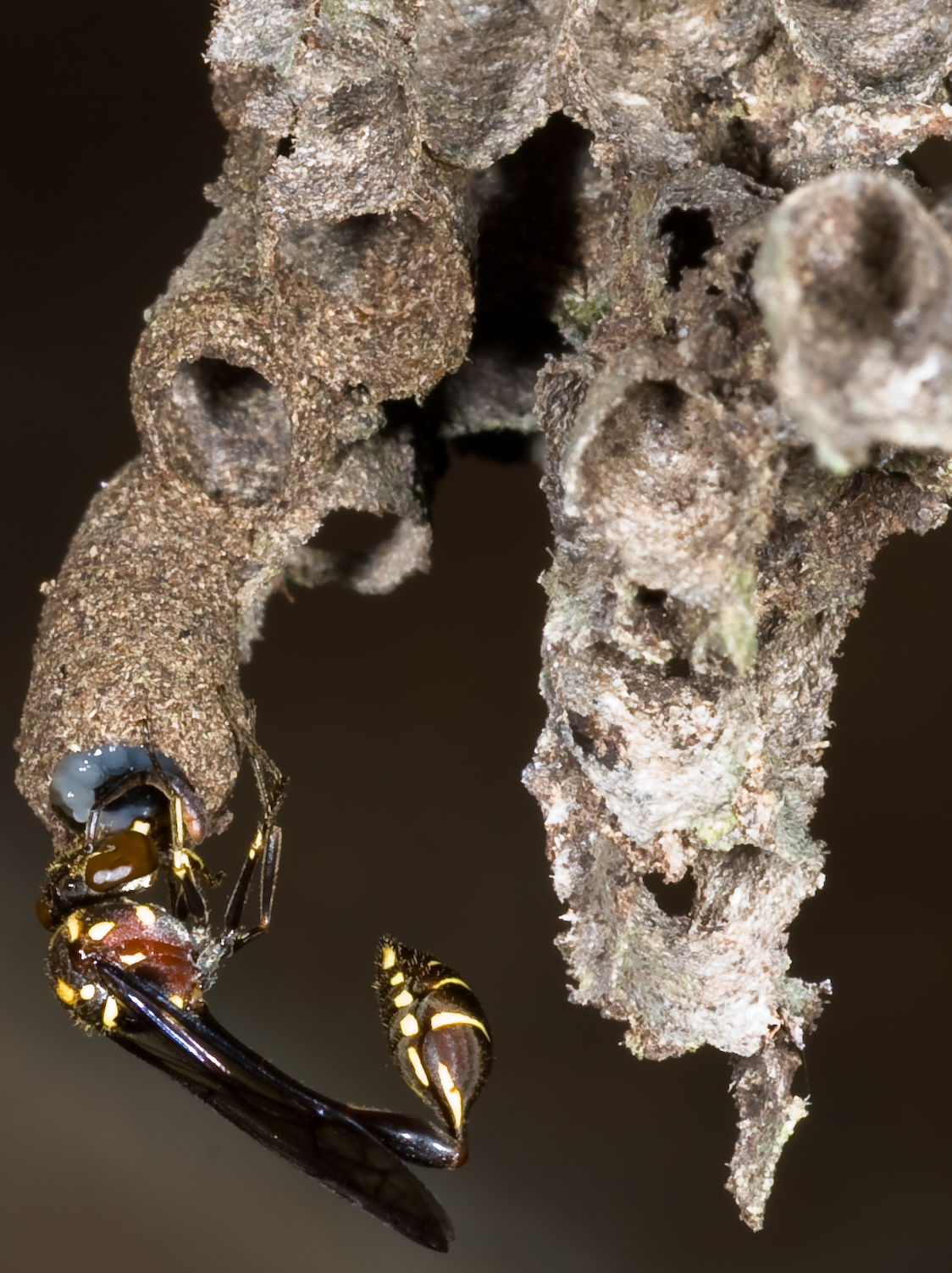
A female of Parischnogaster mellyi attending a larva

Hatching ratio of genders is approximately one-to-one, and average brood size in a one-female nest is 4.68. Additionally, a positive correlation between brood size and the number of males present in a nest attests to the trend that males are more likely to be populated in bigger nests.

== Behavior ==
=== Elementary behaviors ===
Elementary behaviors described in this section pertain to principal behavioral activities that are common to both adult males and females in a given colony.

1. Resting: all adult hover wasps are predominantly completely inactive. Long periods of resting is followed by the characteristic intense burst of "hovering" activity. While there is no major difference in resting positions between males and females, researchers have found that dominant females prefer to occupy the upper resting position of the nest. Resting behavior in P. mellyi is particularly complex, so refer to the video clips in external links.
2. Self-grooming: typical grooming behavior starts with hind legs rubbing against each other, and the abdomen and the wings follow after. The front legs start to rub the head, the mouth parts, and lastly the antennae. Additionally, it has been found that venom secretions, which are slightly antimicrobial, are smeared over the body through grooming, and this suggests that this habit, predominant in females, induces some sort of additional protection against possible pathogens.
3. Flight: flight is characterized by complex hovering and swift changes in flight direction. Individuals keep their legs perfectly near their bodies and their abdomen fully extended.
4. Defecation: researchers have observed defecation (discharge of feces from body) behavior in both female and male P. mellyi. The wasp stops on the edge of a leaf, drags its abdomen towards it, and defecates on the spot. Defecation location has been found to play an important role in marking specific mating “hotspots.”

=== Dominance hierarchy and group social structure ===
While social stratification does not attribute to clean-cut morphological differences, there is behavioral variability that categorizes different social roles that the females can play. While top-dominant females, often called ‘senior-females,’ rarely leave the nest and usually monopolize oviposition, the lower-ranked, worker females engage in more foraging behavior. It has been observed that an individual female P. mellyi has three behavioral options that determines its position on the hierarchy (and thus its future life and “fitness acquisition”): it can either leave the natal colony and found its own colonies (P. mellyi nests are found by single foundresses) or wait on the natal nest to succeed the dominant female role when nests are abandoned (or at times, actively attempt to dethrone her). If this scenario were to happen, the new dominant female would continue rearing those left by the prior occupants. This often leads to continuous formation of stepmother-stepdaughter associations in most nests. Lastly, it can just accept the role of a worker and take care after a number of individuals that are genetically related to themselves.

=== Patrolling behavior ===
One of the behavioral characteristics of Parischnogaster species is its frequent patrolling activity and is extensively found in P. mellyi and P. nigricans serrei. When a male P. mellyi engages in a hovering activity, it usually faces towards the center of a vegetation nearby. It remains to hover for a number of seconds, and then turns around to make a long roundabout, typically horizontally to the left and right. Afterwards, it returns to the original "landmark". When hovering around the landmark, P. mellyi typically extends and contracts its gaster (posterior abdominal region) to display the three white stripes on its tergites. Seven main patrolling behaviors for when the males are in flight have been identified:

1. Detour flight: short flights (for 5–30 seconds) around the hover landmark
2. Solitary display: white dorsal stripes displayed (for 5-40s) in the absence of male competitors
3. Display inducement: another wasp displays its white stripes while flying behind the male
4. Elicited display: white stripes displayed in front of more than one pursuer
5. Zigzag display: distended abdomen hovering horizontally for a few seconds
6. Attack: leg of wasp touches the back of the patrolling male, and the abdomens of the wasps sometime come into contact when the pursuer turns around and flies backwards
7. Received attack: hover male is attacked and hit by the legs or body of the pursuer

Patrolling flights usually take place at certain, well-defined hours of the day. In the West Java region, it has been recorded that P. mellyi leave their nests around 11:00 a.m. and return around 12:45 p.m.

=== Mating behavior ===
Mating activity of P. mellyi is interrelated to its patrolling behavior. An observation study has shown that a male is typically active for 3 weeks or more (up to 32 days), rarely lands while hovering (but does so more frequently towards the end of a patrolling session by walking along the edges of leaves nearby), and feeds themselves at food sources at the end of activity and returns to its nests or communal resting points. In contrast, female P. mellyi appears at patrolling landmarks around the second hour of male activity to engage in sexual interactions. In a typical sexual intercourse, the female approaches the male from the back, lengthening her legs towards his gaster, while the male extends the aerial display, often moving in a zigzag pattern. At this point in time, the female lands on the hover site and repeatedly touches the surface of the site with the tip of her gaster. The male then quickly touches the female’s back with his legs, grabs her chest for a few seconds, and establishes a genital connection for about 2–25 seconds. After the intercourse, the female will clear her genital area with her legs.

When it comes to mating selection, females prefer males who exhibit endurance. By scoring endurance (measured in flight/ patrol time), females can gather reliable and valid information on a male’s quality. A female’s preference towards long-term patrollers could potentially help explain the prolonged male lekking behavior.

Male P. mellyi attempts in homosexual mating have also been observed in a number of captivity studies.

=== Armament-ornament model ===
The characteristic three white stripes on the abdomen of male P. mellyi plays an important role in determining wasp behavior in both intra- and intersexual contexts of the species; the armament-ornament model proposes that the presence of ornaments (in this case, the active display of three white stripes) to be seen as a status badge that is used for both male-to-male competition and courtships for future mates. During patrol activity over its hover sites, male P. mellyi openly displays its three white stripes on its tergites by fully distending its abdomen. A positive correlation has been found between elicited stripe display and mating success: male individuals who displayed their stripes the most, not simply the most active ones, were the individuals who had the highest chance of mating with females. This kind of mating success via the stripes display, however, comes with a cost: According to a stripe manipulation study, when an extra stripe was added, the frequency of the attacks received by the male rival had doubled. In fact, winner males of aerial duels frequently displayed their stripes. Therefore, while stripes were indicators of strength in aerial duels, this sort of status badge was also attractive to females, as predicted by the Armament-Ornament Model.

== Interactions with other species ==
=== Predators ===
It has been observed in Thailand that the Greater banded hornet, Vespa tropica, often preys on colonies of P. mellyi. Damages caused by raids from this hornet can be characterized by gaping holes that are torn out on the sides of the cells.

=== Alarm ===
In some Vespidae species, volatiles in their venom secretion have been found to play a pheromonal role. In particular species, venom seems to function as an alarm for warning the presence of predators in the vicinity. Volatile fraction of P. mellyi venom contains some spiroacetals, which in Polistes and Vespa species seems to serve as a function of alarm pheromones. Previous behavioral bioassays conducted 14 years ago showed no positive correlation between the venom of the Stenogastrinae species and the function of alarm pheromones. However, future investigation seems necessary to establish a clear conclusion on the specific role of P. mellyi venom.
