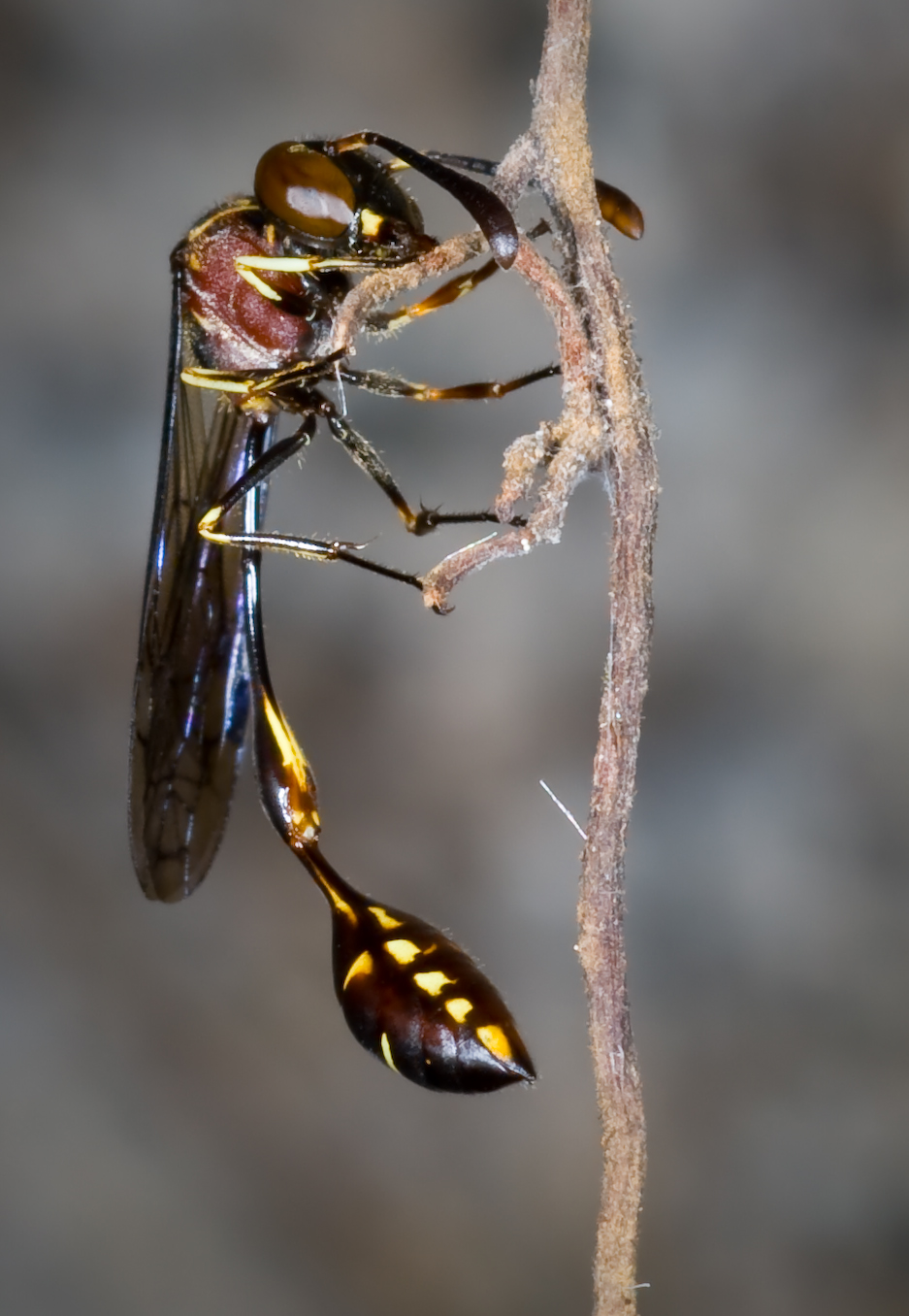
- female of Parischnogaster mellyi

Scientific classification
- Kingdom: Animalia
- Phylum: Arthropoda
- Class: Insecta
- Order: Hymenoptera
- Family: Vespidae
- Subfamily: Stenogastrinae

Genera
- Anischnogaster Vecht, 1972; Cochlischnogaster Dong and Otsuka, 1997; Eustenogaster Vecht, 1969; Liostenogaster Vecht, 1969; Metischnogaster Vecht, 1977; Parischnogaster von Schulthess, 1914; Stenogaster Guérin, 1831

= Stenogastrinae =

Subfamily of wasps

The Stenogastrinae are a subfamily of social wasps included in the family Vespidae. They are sometimes called hover wasps owing to the particular hovering flight of some species. Their morphology and biology present interesting peculiarities.

== Systematic position ==
The first reports on stenogastrine wasps can be found in a book of Guérin de Méneville (1831) with the first known species, Stenogaster fulgipennis. Henri Louis Frédéric de Saussure treated their systematic position and remarked that these wasps were, in all their characters, entirely intermediate between the two subfamilies of Eumeninae and Vespinae. In 1927, Anton von Schulthess-Rechberg created the new genus Parischnogaster for some species living in the Oriental region.

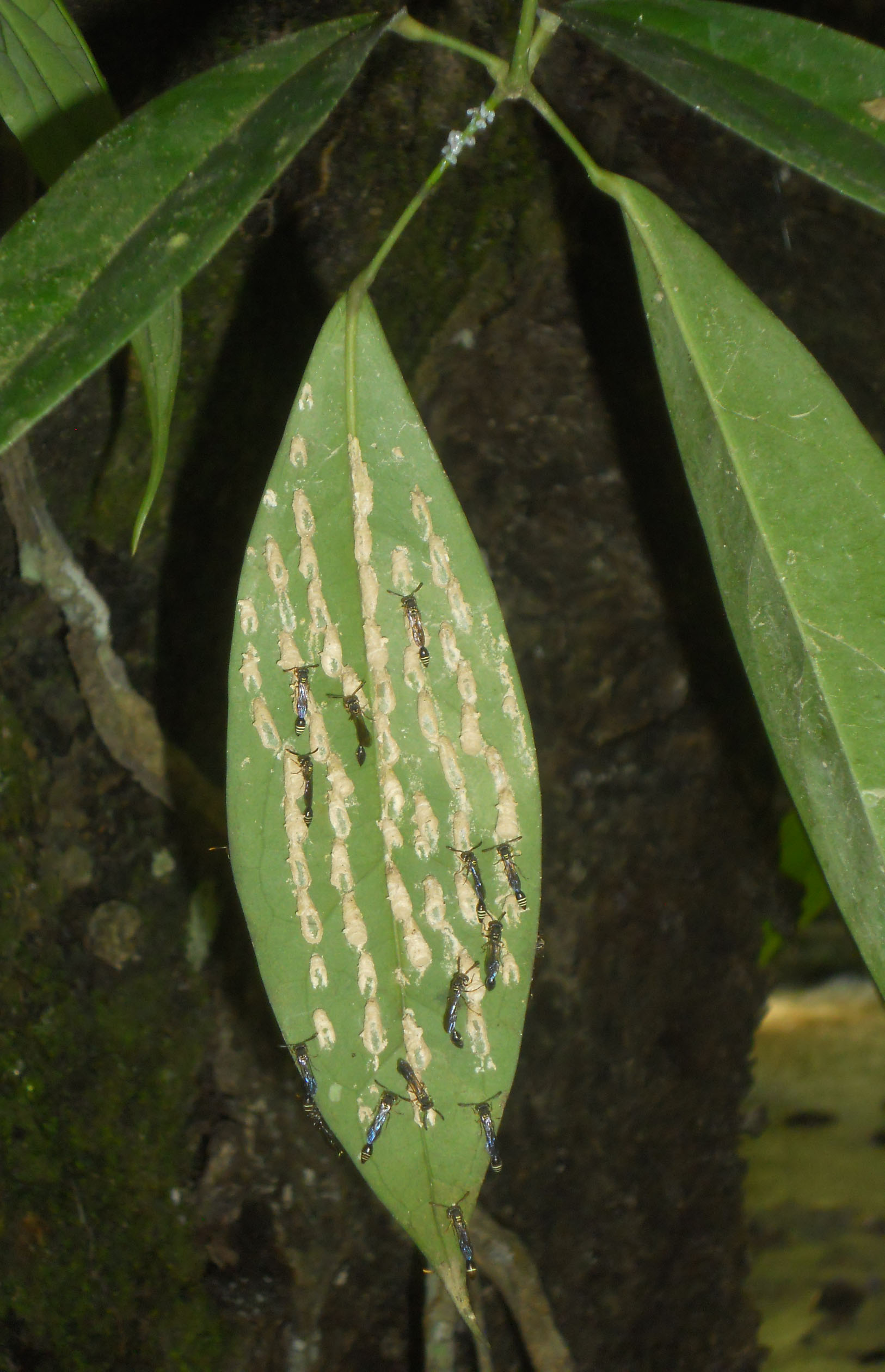
A colony of Parischnogaster (belonging to the jacobsoni group)

Dutch entomologist Jacobus van der Vecht created four new genera including species from the entire area of distribution and described tens of new species. He revised the two Papuan genera Anischnogaster and Stenogaster and the oriental genus Metischnogaster while the largest genera of the Oriental region, Liostenogaster and Eustenogaster, still wait for revision. He also created one more genus, Holischnogaster, which has been then synonymised by Carpenter (1982) with Parischnogaster. A seventh genus, Cochlischnogaster, described by two Chinese entomologists (Dong and Otsuka), has been more recently included in the subfamily. Carpenter made overviews of the taxonomy and phylogeny of the group which he treated as a subfamily of the family Vespidae, and concluded that the Stenogastrinae, Polistinae, and Vespinae are sister groups and derive from a common ancestor (with no other living offspring). A more complete analysis, published 2010, from the same author including biomolecular data, confirmed this phylogeny. However, some other investigations (from 2007 and 2018) indicate that instead the Polistinae, Vespinae, Masarinae, and Eumeninae all are closer related to each others than to the Stenogastrinae.

== Morphology and anatomy of the adults ==
The length of the body varies between 10 (some species of Parischnogaster) and 25 mm (some Eustenogaster species). The colour is usually dark brown with brilliant black shades mixed with yellow, white, or yellowish spots. The wings sometimes have iridescent reflexes. Characteristic is the gastrum, the first segment of which is represented by a long petiole blunted in its posterior part.

=== Head ===
The shape of the head, viewed from the front, is subtriangular owing to the very long mandibles. The compound eyes are large, and the clypeus is usually quite pointed. The antennae are generally clavated. The mandibles are much more subtle with respect to those of polistine or vespine wasps: in the females they can have three teeth, but in the males of some species, their internal margin is almost straight.

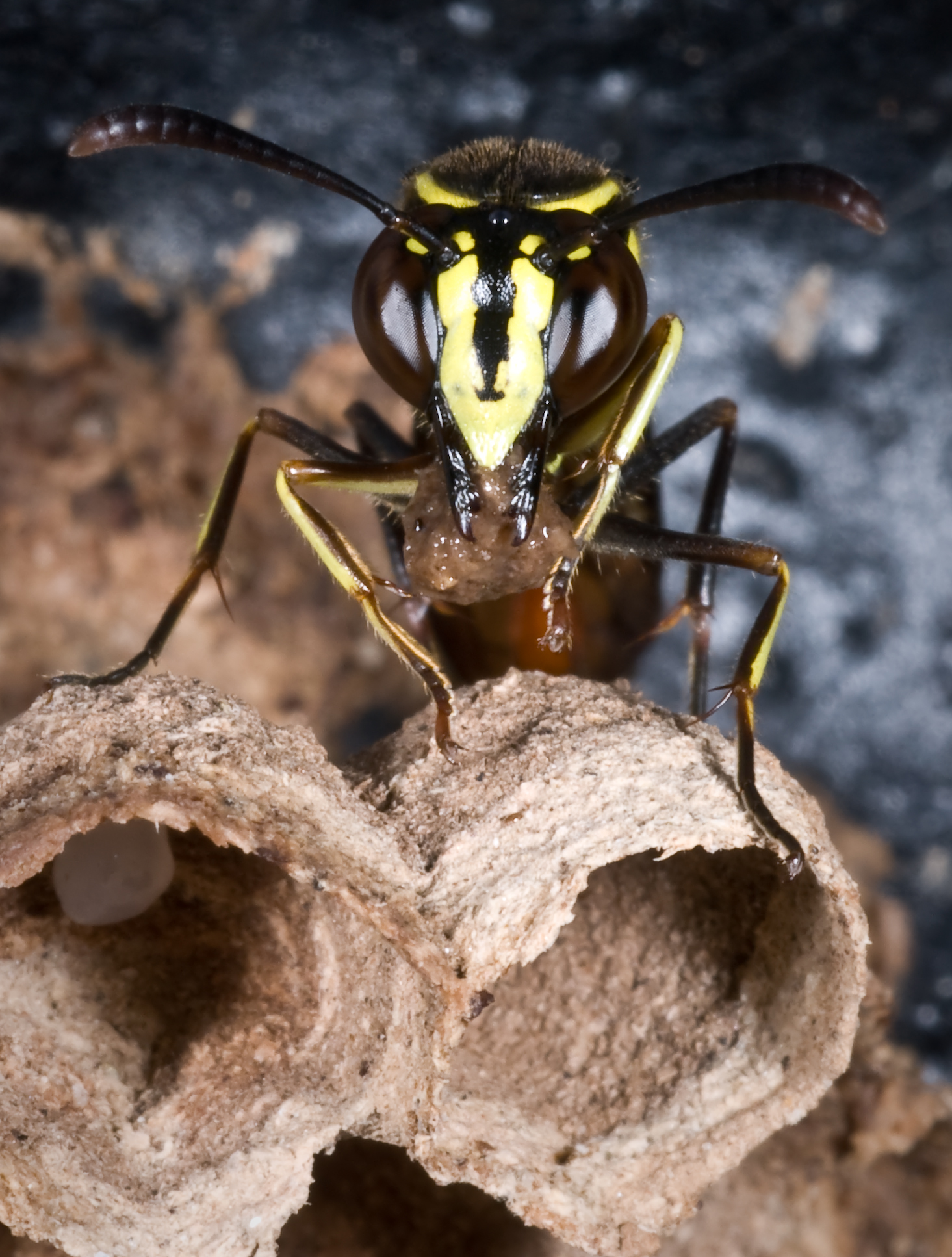
Eustenogaster calyptodoma

=== Mesosoma ===
The mesosoma (composed of three thoracic segments plus the first abdominal segment, the propodeum) is massive and globular. Legs are short and feeble, while the fore wings are not folded longitudinally as occurs in polistine and vespine wasps. The flight of these wasps is characteristic, and some genera (i.e. Parischnogaster, Metischnogaster and Eustenogaster) can hover in the air, remaining almost immobile like small dragonflies. Females are able to fly close to spider webs to steal small prey; the males perform aerial patrolling during particular times of the day, hovering and protecting particular perching sites.

=== Metasoma ===
The metasoma is formed by the abdominal segments minus the first one, which is attached to the last segment of the thorax. The petiole is long as all the other segments together (five in the females and six in the males). This gives these wasps a quite slender silhouette and makes them able to touch the end of the abdomen with the mouth parts when they bend the gastrum ventrally. This is particularly important in egg laying. The last abdominal segments are not externally visible and form the stinging apparatus in the females and the copulatory apparatus in the males. The males possess one more segment than the females and in Parischnogaster, Metischnogaster, and Cochlishnogaster, the dorsal parts (tergites) of some segments are marked with whitish bands which are quite evident when the abdomen is extended.

== Morphology and anatomy of the immature stages ==
=== Egg deposition ===
Egg-laying in hover wasps is peculiar. In all the species observed of at least three genera, it consists of three stages: after initial inspection of a cell, the female bends her abdomen ventrally towards her mouth parts and collects a patch of viscid abdominal substance which is produced in the Dufour's gland. Then, she may inspect the cell again, retaining all the substance in her mouthparts. After stretching the abdomen, the wasp bends it again, with the sting extruded, towards her mouth and collects the egg as it emerges, allowing its concave surface to adhere to the patch of abdominal secretion. The egg is then placed in the cell and stuck to the bottom by a drop of secretion present on its convex surface. The first patch of abdominal substance is left on the concave surface of the egg. After placing the egg, the wasp bends her abdomen again and collects a larger patch of abdominal secretion that is added to the previous patch on the egg.

=== Larva ===
The larval development consists of four stages. Immediately after hatching, the larva curls itself around a mass of gelatinous secretion which covers the eggs produced by the Dufour's gland of the parent. In the very first days, the larvae feed mainly on the liquid food regurgitated by the adults on the secretion mass. Afterwards, cuds of chewed food are inserted by the adults into the secretion mass which is not in itself a food, but rather a substrate which permits the larvae to remain attached to the cell and a "dish" to collect the supplements of the adults. The more the larva increases in size, the less is the secretion added by the adults, so a fourth-instar larva remains curled in the cell pushing its back against the cell walls.

This is another important difference from the other social wasps where the larvae keep their body distended along the longitudinal axis of the cell and present only their heads at the cellular openings. When the adults of the hover wasps nourish their larvae, they touch with their antennae the sides of the larva which opens itself as a kind of sphincter to receive the cud of food. In the other social wasps, instead, the food is supplied by the adults directly into the mouth of the larva.

=== Pupa ===
When pupating, the larva spins an incomplete cocoon inside the cell, but the cell itself is closed by the adults with the same kind of material used for the construction of the nest. In some species, however, the opening of the cell is only narrowed and not completely closed. The operculum is then reopened some 2–3 days afterwards so the adults can eliminate the larval faeces which have been emitted by the larvae after pupation. Once the larval meconium is eliminated, the hole in the operculum is closed again by the adults. The pupa changes its position in the cell with the body along the longitudinal axis and its head towards the operculum with the abdomen bent towards the mouthparts. The development from egg to emergence varies widely according to various species and environmental situations, but knowledge about this is quite limited. The complete larval development lasts a minimum of 43 days on average in Parischnogaster mellyi and a maximum of 105 days on average in Liostenogaster flavolineata. Eustenogaster calyptodoma presents an average larval development around 63 days. The well-formed adult is able to emerge from the cell after the break of the operculum without any help.

== Colonial cycle and social organization ==
=== Nest foundation ===
In the hover wasps, in most cases, the nest is founded by a solitary fertilized female (foundress), but in some cases may have more than one foundress. Associative nest foundation is reported for some species of Parischnogaster and in Liostenogaster vechti.

=== Colonial size ===
In some species, the average number of females per colony registered in a population is less than two as the daughters of the foundress female remain with their mother to help her in foraging and breeding the larvae, but left the colony when they are able to found a nest on their own. The number of adults can vary under the 10 units and rarely goes beyond even counting the individuals of two sexes. On a nest of Liostenogaster topographica were once found 32 individuals. The maximum number of cells ever counted was 110 in a nest of L. flavolineata, while other species can occasionally reach a hundred of cells.

=== Colonial population dynamics ===
The development of a society of hover wasps can be extremely long. The egg-laying capacity of one female is quite limited if compared with that of the queen of a colony of other social wasps. The first wasps to emerge from the eggs laid by the foundress are females. Not all the individuals emerged remain in the maternal colony and many of them leave. In theory, a female should remain if she has a good chance to inherit the colony; however, if many others are in line for the same nest and offer a better chance of reproductive success, it may be more convenient to try other reproductive strategies.

Young females which have emerged in a colony have various behavioural options. In fact, the colonies of hover wasps do not present rigid castes, and individuals are conditioned in their choices only by the contingent situation of the social environment in which they find themselves. Females are all able to mate, thus are able to lay fertilized (female) eggs and becoming potential new colony foundresses. This course depends on the situation which they find on their natal colony. They can leave the maternal colony to try to found their own colonies; they can remain on the maternal nest waiting to succeed the dominant female when she fails or try to dethrone her; or they can resign themselves to work as workers to rear a certain number of individuals which are genetically related to themselves.

Average relatedness coefficient between females found on the same colony have been measured for some species and it is not particularly high. In all the species examined, most of the eggs are produced by only one single mated female. The advantage to being in a group is that helper females have a life insurance-based advantage over lone wasps because if they die, most of the brood they have partly reared will be brought to maturity by surviving nestmates. A strict age-based inheritance queue seems to regulate the access to reproduction in this species: new dominants are the oldest female in their groups in most of the cases. In many nests, some brood could not be assigned to existing adult females. This indicates the high adult mortality rates result in direct advantages to helpers in the form of colony inheritance, and indirect advantages via life insurance.

=== Male behaviour and mating ===
The males belonging to species of at least four of the oriental genera (Liostenogaster, Eustenogaster, Parischnogaster, and Metischnogaster) leave the nests and reach well-defined sites where they patrol localized territories of various kinds. Each territory is formed by a number of perches which can be leaves, sticks, and other prominent things of the landscape, usually in a clearing of the forest. L. flavolineata males fly in circuits and land on perches where they rub their gastral tergites, probably releasing a marking pheromone. In Eustenogaster species, males remain motionless on perches, raising their wings and gaster. Parischnogaster and Metischnogaster, instead, hover in flight near the perch, making visible now and then the whitish and shiny bands of their tergal gastra.

=== Nest ===
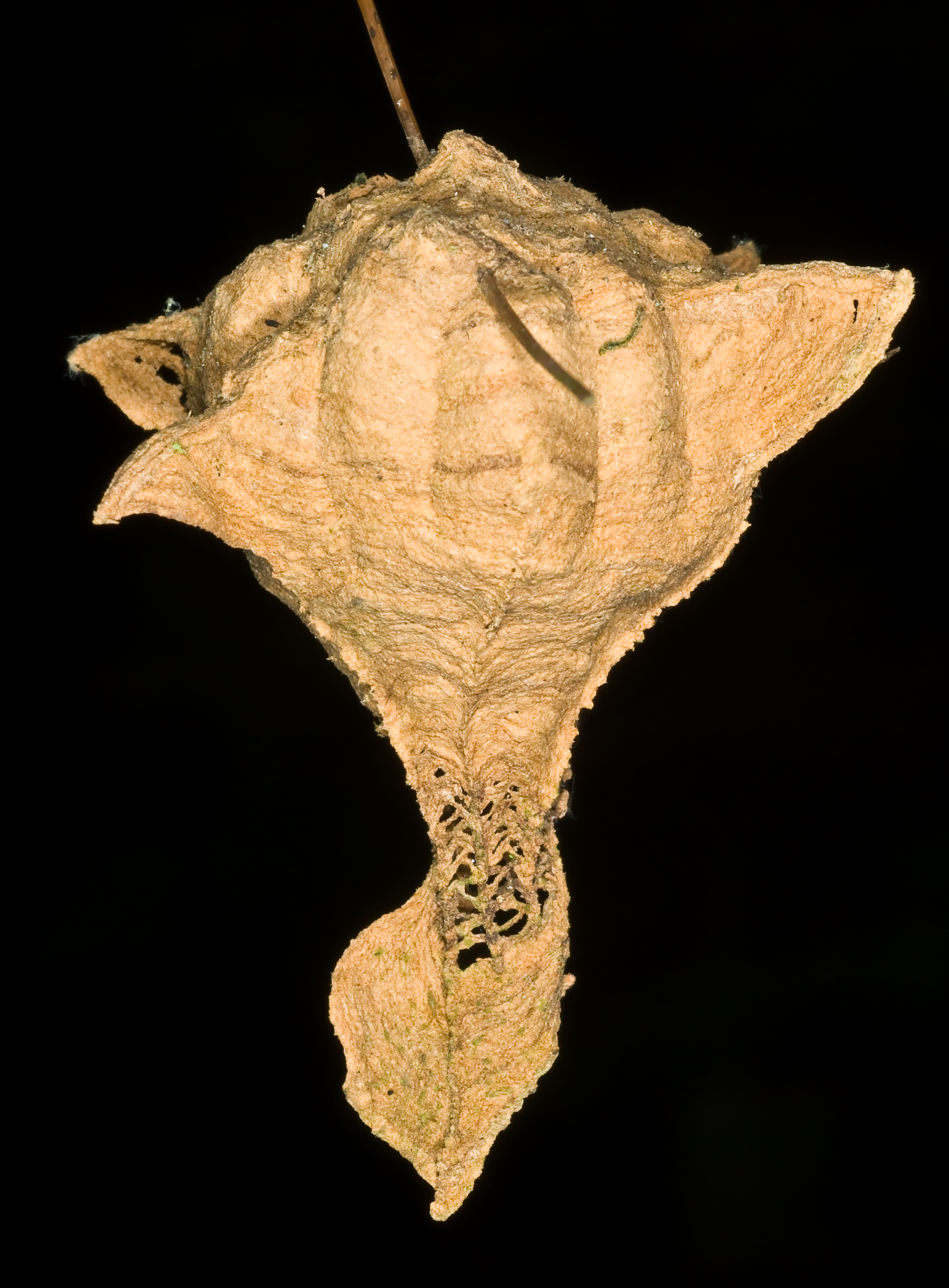
Nest of Eustenogaster fraterna

The nest is one of the characters which are common to all social insects and represents an important factor for the origin and evolution of their social life. Stenogastrine nest architecture differs from that of other social wasps and has such an incredible variety of shapes, it has in some instances been used as a systematic character. None of the nests of any stenogastrine species has a petiole (or peduncle), which is one of the more striking differences with respect to the nests of other eusocial wasps. Rather, cells are built directly on various kinds of flat or threadlike substrates. Another important difference is that these wasps use a construction material which is of a poor quality compared to that used by other social wasps. According to Hansell (1996), this is because their mandibles are not suitable for the collection of long vegetable fibres as are those of other vespids. Moreover, the collected material is kept together by a cement (salivary) secretion which is too scarce (and probably not so good) to assure the production of a good paper paste. Hansell maintains this limits the possibility of building large nests and, consequently, the formation of large colonies prevents the development of a more evolved sociality in these wasps.

== Interspecific variability ==
Interspecific variability in nest architecture is certainly quite high in these wasps, but a considerable variability is also present in some species.

Stenogaster: The nest of S. concinna has a bell-shaped architecture, is formed by a low number of cells, and is built with 'soil' containing a few small pieces of vegetable matter.

Anischnogaster: The nests of A. iridipennis are built of fine mud with occasional small pieces of stone and vegetable matter incorporated into the structure. In A. laticeps, the nests are actually quite small with an average of three cells and a maximum of eight.

Liostenogaster: The nest architecture of this genus presents the largest diversification. Nests can be built entirely with mud or with relevant part of vegetable material. L. flavolineata, L. pardii, L. campanulae, L. varipicta, and L. tutua belong to the first group. The vegetable material nest group includes L. nitidipennis, L. vechti, L. abstrusa, L. topographica, and L. filicis.

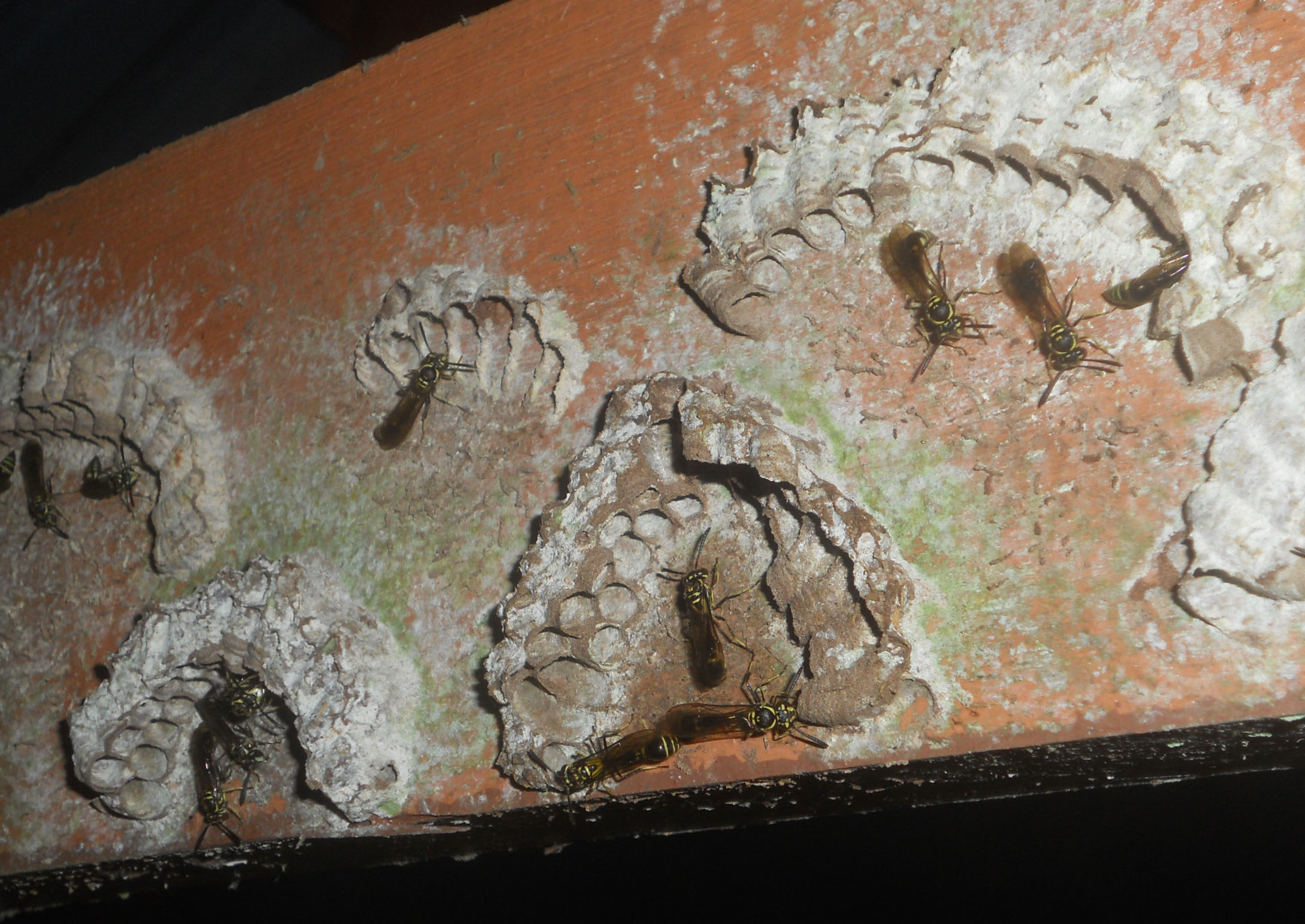
Clusters of colonies of Liostenogaster vechti

Parischnogaster: This genus includes the most common species of hover wasps; their nests can be found on plants, but are quite commonly associated with human buildings. For instance, Parischnogaster mellyi construct their nests under roofs of thatched huts and houses in rural areas. Architectural form varies from cells scattered along substrata to more elaborated structures with cells opening in common tubes. This genus also uses mimicry to keep nests well hidden from predators. P. striatula is able to match the outer texture of the nest to its surroundings, by making it rough or smooth.

Eustenogaster: These relatively large and robust hover wasps present a distinctive nest structure with the central part of the nest formed by a comb of a bunch (usually 8-20) of cells. The external walls of the peripheral cells are extended downwards to form a narrow spout at least as long as the cells and acting as an envelope.

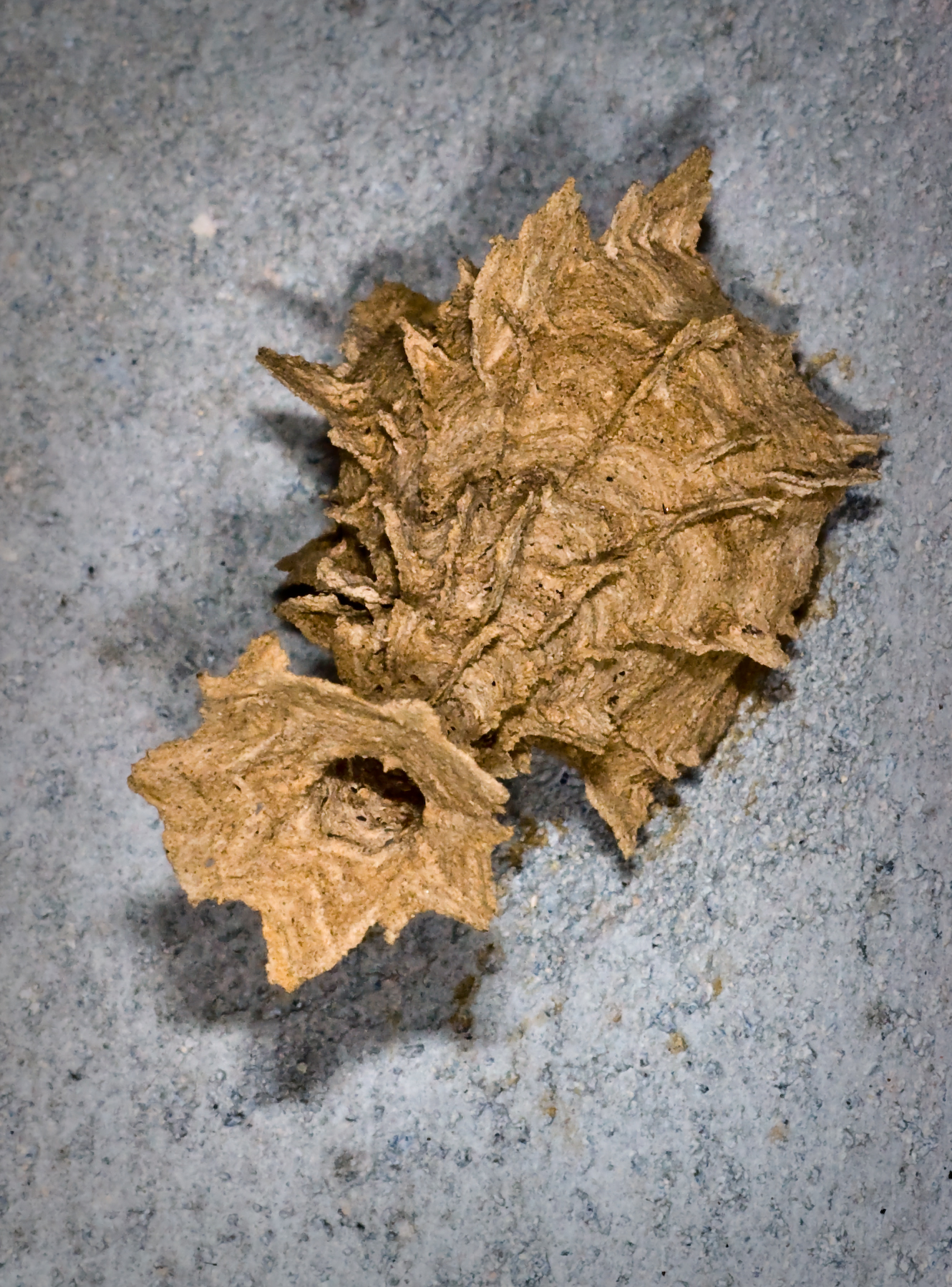
Nest of Eustenogaster micans

Metischnogaster: The genus includes two species with the most highly camouflaged nests consisting of a row of cells, the first of which is attached with its bottom to the tip of a thread-like suspension. The second cell is attached to the lower end of the first, the third to that of the second and so on. A special conical structure is built above the line of cells acting as a "drop stopper".

Cochlischnogaster: No information is at present available for the nest architecture of any species of this genus.

The evolution of the nest architecture in these wasps has been especially determined by the pressure exerted by predators such as ants and tropical hornets. Against the first ones, some species build special sticky, gelatinous structures, called "ant guards", formed with the secretion of the Dufour gland which are placed as barriers to the nests. Nest camouflage, instead, is the first determinant of the defence against the attacks of hornets. Another defence system used by some species is to form dense clusters of nests in sites seldom practiced by the above predators.
