= Robert du Buysson =

French lichenologist and mycologist (1861–1946)

Robert François du Buysson
- Born: 6 May 1861; Broût-Vernet, Second French Empire
- Died: 16 March 1946 (aged 84); Saint-Rémy-la-Varenne, France
- Scientific career
- Fields: Natural history

Robert François du Buysson (6 May 1861 in Broût-Vernet (Allier) – 16 March 1946 in Saint-Rémy-la-Varenne (Maine-et-Loire)), was a French naturalist.

== Biography ==
He is the son of botanist fr:François-Charles du Buysson (1825-1906) and Mathilde de Montaignac (1829-1899) and the brother of entomologist fr:Henri du Buysson.

Having developed a taste for herbariums at a very young age and a keen sense of observation, Robert du Buysson began to study the mosses of his native region rapidly expanding his field of study to lichens and vascular cryptogams. From 1888 to 1893 he published an inventory of vascular cryptogams of Europe in the Scientific Review of Bourbonnais and the Centre of France. In the field of bryology, the name of Robert du Buysson remains attached to two species: Orthorichum berthoumieui, named in honor of Father Berthoumieu with whom he studied the mosses around Saint-Pourçain (Allier), and Barbula buyssoni.

Robert du Buysson distinguished himself especially in the study of insects. In April 1898 he obtained a position as a temporary entomology preparer at the Zoology Laboratory of the National Museum of Natural History in Paris. In 1900, he was appointed titular preparer for insects and crustaceans. Most of his work has been published in the Annales de la Société entomologique de France

Robert du Buysson bequeathed his collection of hymenoptera to the entomology laboratory of the National Museum of Natural History.

== Family ==
Du Buysson married Claire d'Espinay on February 8, 1899, and had one daughter, Marie-Cécile du Buysson (1899-1997)

His two siblings were Henri du Buysson, Marquis du Buysson (1856-1927) and Isabelle du Buysson b.1858.

== Publications ==
- List may be incomplete.

=== 1888 ===
- du Buysson, R., 1905: "Monographie des cryptogames vasculaires d’Europe". Revue scientifique du Bourbonnais et du centre de la France: v.1-3 (1888-1890): 38-45, 112-121, 153-164, 201-210, 245-253

=== 1893 ===
- du Buysson, R., 1905: "Monographie des cryptogames vasculaires d’Europe". Revue scientifique du Bourbonnais et du centre de la France: v.6-7 (1893-1894): 173-182, 189-196

=== 1903 ===
- du Buysson, R., 1903: "Note pour servir à l'histoire des Strepsiptères". Bull. Soc. Ent. France 1903: 174-175

=== 1905 ===
- du Buysson, R., 1905: "Monographie des guêpes ou Vespa". Ann. Soc. Ent. France t.72: 260–288
- du Buysson, R., 1905: "Monographie des guêpes ou Vespa (Parts 2 and 3)". Ann. Soc. Ent. France t.73: 485–556, 565-634
- du Buysson, R., 1905: "Monographie des Vespides du genre Nectarina". Ann. Soc. Ent. France t.74: 537–566
- du Buysson, R., 1905: "Descriptions d'Hyménoptères nouveaux". Bull. Soc. Ent. France. 1905: 281–282

=== 1907 ===
- du Buysson, R., 1907: "Nouvelles espèces d'Ischnogaster (Hyménoptères) appartenant au Musée de Leide". Notes from the Leyden Museum t.29: 79–80

=== 1908 ===
- du Buysson, R., 1908: "Deux Hyménoptères nouveaux de Java". Notes from the Leyden Museum t.30: 123–126

=== 1909 ===
- du Buysson, R., 1909: "Hyménoptères nouveaux ou peu connus". Annali del Museo di Storia Naturale di Genova ser.3:v.44 (1908-1910): 312–315
- du Buysson, R., 1909: "Deux Hyménoptères nouveaux d'Océanie". Bull. Soc. Ent. France 1909: 305–306

=== 1913 ===
- du Buysson, R., 1913: "Vespidae et Eumenidae". Abhandlungen der Senckenbergischen Naturforschenden Gesellschaft Vol. 34 1911-1913: 227–230
- du Buysson, R., 1913: "Sur deux Vespides de Java". Bulletin du Muséum royal d'Histoire naturelle Vol. 19 1913, Paris: 436–437
- du Buysson, R., 1913: "Sur quelques Vespides (Hym.)". Bull. Soc. Ent. France 1913: 296–301

== Notes ==
- Lamy (D.), « Robert du Buysson (1861-1946) et la bryologie dans l'Allier entre 1870 et 1895 », in Cryptogamie. Bryologie, lichénologie, INIST-CNRS, 1984, ISSN 0181-1576.

== Sources ==
- Biographical information is based on a translation from an equivalent article at the French French Wikipedia.
