= Dufour's gland =

Insect abdominal gland

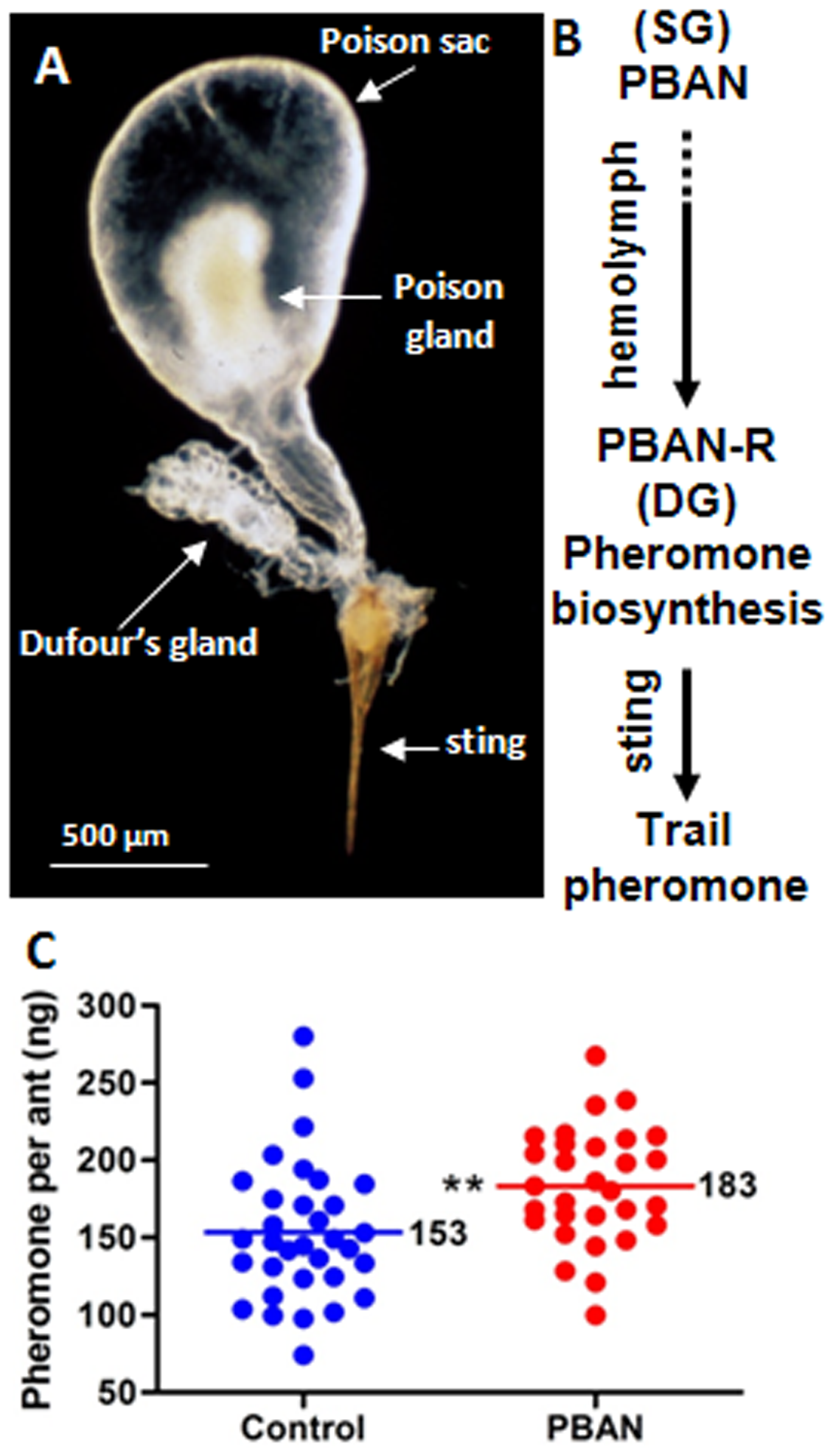
Dufour's gland of a red imported fire ant

Dufour's gland is an abdominal gland of certain insects, part of the anatomy of the ovipositor or sting apparatus in female members of Apocrita. The diversification of Hymenoptera took place in the Cretaceous and the gland may have developed at about this time (200 million years ago) as it is present in all three groups of Apocrita, the wasps, bees and ants.

== Structure ==
Dufour's gland was first described by Léon Jean Marie Dufour in 1841. Along with the spermatheca and the poison gland, it develops as an invagination of valves of the sternum. It empties at the base of the ovipositor in ants but into the dorsal vaginal wall in bees and wasps. The gland is lined by a single layer of epithelial cells which secrete substances into the hollow interior. Muscles round the opening of the duct and may help control the outflow.

== Function ==
Dufour's gland secretes chemicals, the nature and functions of which differs across various hymenopteran groups. The secretion is often used in communication to mark members of the colony, to mark hosts (parasitic wasps), during slave raids (ants), for territory marking (ants), to signal fertility, to attract a member of the opposite sex, to give an alarm warning (ants) or to mark a trail (ants). This use of scent marking pheromones secreted by Dufour's gland is observed in the carpenter bee Xylocopa pubescens to mark flowers and nests. Other functions include lubricating the valves of the ovipositor during egg-laying, serving as a component of material used to build the nest, serving as a food for the developing larvae and being mixed with pollen and nectar to provision the brood cell before egg-laying. For instance, a well-developed Dufour's gland is one of the main physical characteristics of a social wasp Parischnogaster mellyi, and the abundant abdominal secretion from the gland has been found to play an important role in egg development and oviposition. The gland is well developed in various solitary mining bees where it is used to waterproof and make the lining of the brood cells fungus resistant.

Furthermore, the Dufour's gland of the parasitic Vespula austriaca wasp releases substances that prevent oogenesis in workers to suppress reproduction in host workers.
