= List of hymenopterans of Sri Lanka =

Sri Lanka is a tropical island situated close to the southern tip of India. The invertebrate fauna is as large as it is common to other regions of the world. There are about 2 million species of arthropods found in the world, and more are still being discovered to this day. This makes it very complicated and difficult to summarize the exact number of species found within a certain region.

This is a list of the hymenopterans found from Sri Lanka.

== Hymenoptera ==
Phylum: Arthropoda
Class: Insecta
Order: Hymenoptera

Hymenoptera is a large order containing an estimated 1,500,000 species of ants, bees, wasps, and sawfly. Females of hymenopterans possess a special ovipositor, which is used for inserting eggs into hosts or other surfaces safely. In some groups, this ovipositor is modified into a stinger, which is used primarily for defense purposes. Hymenopterans show a complete metamorphosis, where they have a worm-like larval stage and an inactive pupal stage before they mature. All hymenopterans are typically divided into two suborders. Those who have a narrow waist are categorized into suborder Apocrita, whereas those who absent a waist into suborder Symphyta. Wasps, bees, and ants are belong to Apocrita. Sawflies, horntails, and parasitic wood wasps are belong to Symphyta.

Bees are the primary pollinators of terrestrial flowering plants. The hairs within its body helps to function as efficient pollinators. The highest bee diversity is confined to warm temperate regions of the world. Bee attacks are sometimes found from some areas, but it is not fatal as that of a wasp. There are about 70,000 bee species described in the world with nearly 450 genera and 7 families. Out of them, Sri Lanka comprises 151 species included to 39 genera and 4 families. The bee researches are extensively carried out by Dr. Inoka Karunaratne et al. from University of Sri Lanka.

Ants are social insects that can be found in terrestrial ecosystems. They are also very common in human settlements, as well as in forest floor. Well over 6000 species of ants were found and described, and new species are about to discover. Sri Lanka is home to 229 species of ants that included to 66 genera and 12 subfamilies. There are 102 endemic species in Sri Lanka, with 48.6% of endemism. One endemic genus Aneuretus is also included to the list. The following list is according to the Ants of Sri Lanka by Prof. R.K. Sriyani Dias 2014 comprehensive edition by Biodiversity Secretariat on Ministry of Environmental and Renewable Energy of Sri Lanka.

Wasps are morphologically resemble bees, but are different group of hymenopterans. They are eusocial insects, with a prominent stinger. Few wasps are solitary in behavior and they are mostly parasitoids. They are important agriculturally, hence used a biological predator to eradicate pests and other agriculturally harmful insects. Wasp attacks are more frequent in Sri Lanka, where they are known to attack humans when provoked. They are numerous around many archeological sites and attacks sometimes can be fatal to death. In 1897, Bingham compiles the hymenopteran diversity within the island through the volume The Fauna of British India including Ceylon and Burma, Hymenoptera Vol. 1, Wasps and Bees. In 2001, K.V. Krombein and B.B Norden published notes on trap nesting Sri Lankan wasps and bees.

=== Family: Agaonidae - Fig wasps ===
- Eupristina masoni
- Karadibia gestroi
- Platyscapa frontalis
- Sycoscapter stabilis
- Watshamiella infida

=== Family: Ampulicidae - Cockroach wasps ===
- Ampulex ceylonica
- Ampulex compressa
- Dolichurus albifacies
- Dolichurus aridulus
- Dolichurus lankensis
- Dolichurus silvicola
- Trirogma regalis

=== Family: Aphelinidae - Aphelinid wasps ===
- Ablerus connectens
- Aphelinus lankaensis
- Coccophagus flavescens
- Coccophagus longifasciatus
- Coccophagus srilankensis
- Coccophagus zebratus
- Encarsia aonidiae
- Encarsia bimaculata
- Encarsia planchoniae
- Encarsia sophia
- Marietta leopardina
- Proaphelinoides elongatiformis
- Promuscidea unfasciativentris

=== Family: Aulacidae - Aulacids ===
- Pristaulacus krombeini
- Pristaulacus signatus

=== Family: Braconidae - Braconids ===
- Aleiodes euproctis
- Apanteles paludicolae
- Apanteles pratapae
- Apanteles tiracolae
- Aphrastobracon flavipennis
- Aspilota ceylonica
- Bracon albolineatus
- Bracon greeni
- Gammabracon erythroura
- Homolobus truncatoides
- Schoenlandella nigromaculata

=== Family: Chalcididae - Chalcids ===
- Antrocephalus ceylonicus
- Antrocephalus dividens
- Antrocephalus mitys
- Brachymeria nephantidis
- Dirhinus altispina
- Dirhinus claviger
- Dirhinus pilifer
- Dirhinus sinon
- Epitranus nigriceps
- Epitranus observatory
- Hockeria lankana
- Hockeria tristis
- Neochalcis cinca
- Rhynchochalcis brevicornuta
- Tropimeris monodon

=== Family: Chrysididae - Cuckoo wasps ===
- Chrysis ionophris
- Loboscelidia ora
- Stilbum cyanurum

=== Family: Crabronidae - Crabronid wasps ===
- Cerceris erythrosoma
- Cerceris hortivaga
- Crossocerus nitidicorpus
- Psenulus carinifrons
- Tachytes modestus

=== Family: Dryinidae - Dryinid wasps ===
- Anteon lankanum
- Anteon sulawesianum
- Gonatopus lini

=== Family: Encyrtidae - Encyrtids ===
- Adelencyrtus chionaspidis
- Anagyrus greeni
- Anicetus ceylonensis
- Anthemus chionaspidis
- Aschitus lichtensiae
- Astymachus japonicas
- Callipteroma testacea
- Cheiloneuromyia planchoniae
- Cheiloneurus hadrodorys
- Copidosoma agrotis
- Encyrtus adustipennis
- Encyrtus corvinus
- Exoristobia philippinensis
- Homalopoda cristata
- Metaphycus lichtensiae
- Parablastothrix nepticulae
- Psyllaephagus yaseeni
- Tachardiaephagus tachardiae

=== Family: Eucharitidae - Eucharitid wasps ===
- Chalcura deprivata
- Cherianella narayani
- Eucharis cassius
- Neolosbanus laeviceps
- Schizaspidia convergens
- Schizaspidia nasua

=== Family: Eulophidae - Eulophids ===
- Ceranisus nigricornis
- Ceranisus semitestaceus
- Chrysocharis lankensis
- Cirrospilus ambiguus
- Cirrospilus coccivorus
- Closterocerus insignis
- Closterocerus pulcherrimus
- Elasmus anamalaianus
- Elasmus ashmeadi
- Elasmus binocellatus
- Elasmus brevicornis
- Elasmus indicus
- Elasmus khandalus
- Elasmus kollimalaianus
- Elasmus nagombiensis
- Elasmus narendrani
- Elasmus punensis
- Eulophus tardescens
- Euplectromorpha formosus
- Euplectromorpha jamburaliyaensis
- Euplectromorpha laminum
- Euplectrus atrafacies
- Euplectrus ceylonensis
- Euplectrus colliosilvus
- Euplectrus geethae
- Euplectrus leucostomus
- Euplectrus litoralis
- Euplectrus mellocoxus
- Euplectrus nibilis
- Euplectrus peechansis
- Euplectrus xanthovultus
- Metaplectrus solitarius
- Metaplectrus teresgaster
- Metaplectrus thoseae
- Oomyzus ovulorum
- Parasecodes bali
- Parasecodes ratnapur
- Platyplectrus coracinus
- Platyplectrus flavus
- Platyplectrus gannoruwaensis
- Platyplectrus melinus
- Platyplectrus truncatus
- Sarasvatia srilankensis
- Sympiesis striatipes
- Tamarixia leucaenae
- Tetrastichus howardi
- Tetrastichus lankicus
- Tetrastichus niger
- Tetrastichus patannas
- Trichospilus diatraeae
- Trichospilus pupivorus

=== Family: Eupelmidae - Eupelmids ===
- Balcha reticulifrons
- Calosota aestivalis
- Eupelmus javae
- Eupelmus tachardiae
- Metapelma albisquamulata
- Metapelma taprobanae

=== Family: Eurytomidae - Seed chalcids ===
- Eurytoma attiva
- Eurytoma contraria
- Prodecatoma josephi

=== Family: Figitidae - Figitids ===
- Prosaspicera validispina

=== Family: Ichneumonidae - Ichneumonids ===
- Casinaria lenticulata
- Chriodes orientalis
- Dusona flinti
- Enicospilus abessyniensis
- Enicospilus albiger
- Enicospilus krombeini
- Enicospilus laqueatus
- Temelucha pestifer
- Venturia lankana
- Venturia triangulata

=== Family: Leucospidae - Leucospids ===
- Leucospis lankana
- Leucospis viridissima

=== Family: Mymaridae - Fairyflies ===
- Acmopolynema narendrani
- Anagrus elegans
- Camptoptera enocki
- Camptoptera protuberculata
- Camptoptera serenellae
- Camptoptera tuberculata
- Ptilomymar besucheti
- Stephanodes similis

=== Family: Orussidae - Parasitic wood wasps ===
- Mocsarya metallica

=== Family: Perilampidae - Perilampids ===
- Krombeinius eumenidarum
- Krombeinius srilanka
- Monacon angustum
- Monacon senex

=== Family: Platygastridae - Platygastrids ===
- Embidobia orientalis
- Habroteleia flavipes
- Heptascelio striatosternus
- Opisthacantha infortunata
- Oxyscelio ceylonensis
- Oxyscelio cuculli
- Scelio apo
- Scelio consobrinus
- Scelio variicornis
- Tanaodytes soror
- Telenomus adenyus
- Telenomus molorchus
- Telenomus sechellensis
- Trissolcus aloysiisabaudiae
- Trissolcus mitsukurii
- Trissolcus sulmo

=== Family: Pompilidae - Spider wasps ===
- Agenioideus smithi
- Auplopus cyanellus
- Auplopus funerator
- Auplopus imitabilis
- Auplopus krombeini
- Auplopus laeviculus
- Auplopus lankaensis
- Cyphononyx confusus
- Episyron arrogans
- Episyron novarae
- Episyron praestigiosum
- Episyron tenebricum
- Evania appendigaster
- Hemipepsis caeruleopennis
- Hemipepsis fulvipennis
- Irenangelus punctipleuris
- Java atropos
- Pompilus cinereus
- Pompilus mirandus
- Pseudagenia aegina
- Pygmachus krombeini

=== Family: Pteromalidae - Pteromalids ===
- Coelopisthia lankana
- Dinarmus vagabundus
- Dipara intermedia
- Grahamisia gastra
- Halticoptera propinqua
- Herbertia indica
- Mnoonema timida
- Neolyubana noyesi
- Papuopsia striata
- Philotrypesis quadrisetosa
- Sphegigaster brunneicornis
- Walkarella temeraria

=== Family: Rhopalosomatidae - Rhopalosomatid wasps ===
- Paniscomima abnormis
- Paniscomima darlingi
- Paniscomima lottacontinua

=== Family: Scoliidae - Scoliid wasps ===
- Liacos erythrosoma

=== Family: Sphecidae - Thread-waisted wasps ===
- Chalybion bengalense
- Chalybion fuscum
- Chalybion gracile
- Sceliphron coromandelicum
- Sceliphron spinolae
- Sphex fumicatus
- Sphex sericeus
- Sphex subtruncatus - ssp krombeini

=== Family: Torymidae - Torymids ===
- Odopoia atra
- Palmon greeni
- Podagrion charybdis
- Podagrion epibulum
- Podagrion judas
- Podagrion micans
- Podagrion scylla
- Torymoides amabilis

=== Family: Trichogrammatidae - Trichogrammatids ===
- Mirufens ceylonensis

=== Family: Vespidae - Social wasps ===
- Antepipona bipustulata
- Antepipona frontalis
- Antepipona ovalis
- Cyrtolabulus suavis
- Ischnogaster eximius
- Mitrodynerus vitripennis
- Polistes stigma - ssp. infraspecies, tamula
- Rhynchium brunneum
- Ropalidia marginata
- Symmorphus alkimus
- Vespa affinis - ssp. indosinensis
- Vespa mandarinia
- Vespa tropica - ssp. haematodes
