= A. incertus =

A. incertus may refer to:

- Abacetus incertus, a ground beetle
- Alphamenes incertus, a wasp
