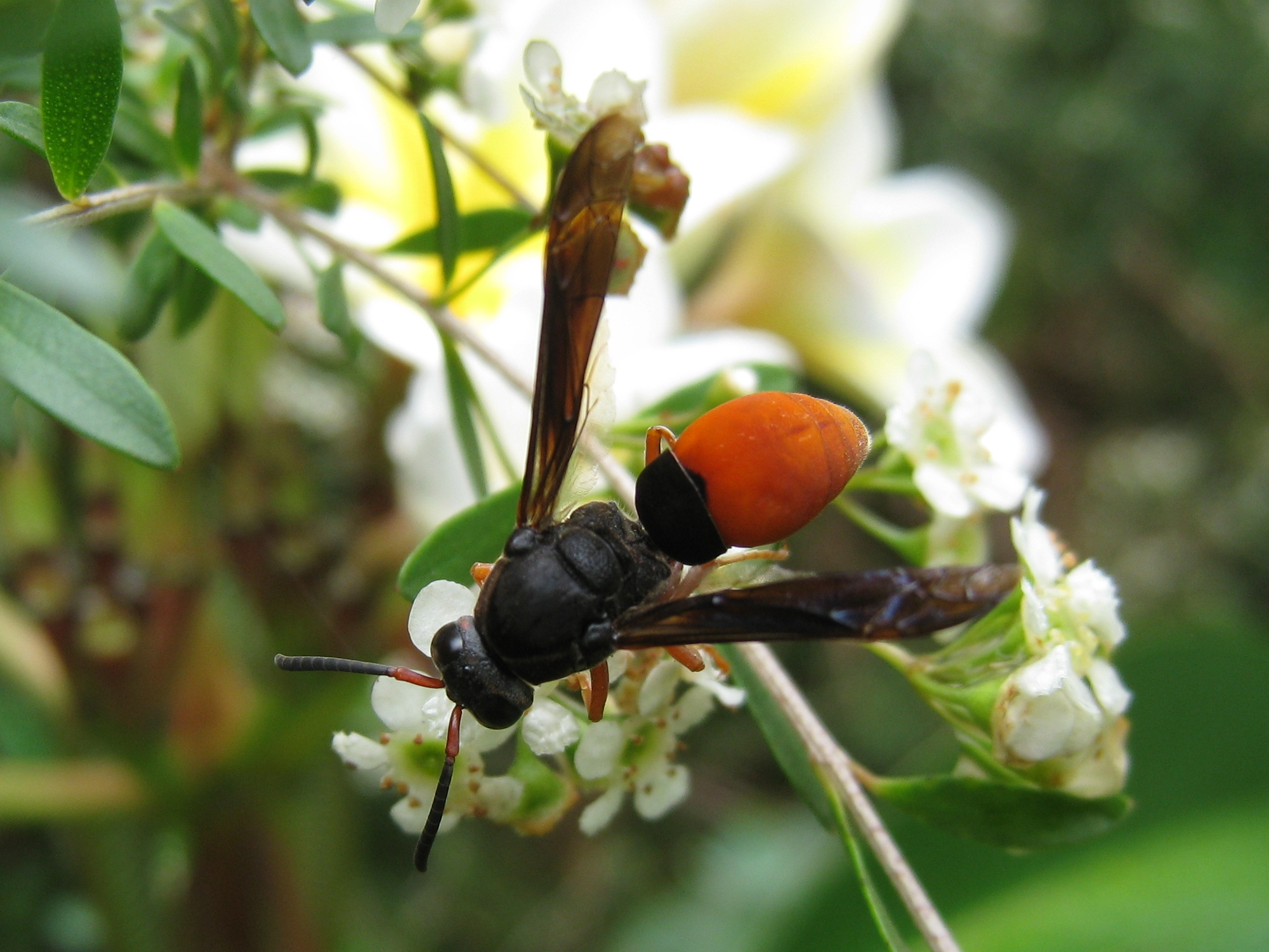
- Pseudabispa bicolor

Scientific classification
- Domain: Eukaryota
- Kingdom: Animalia
- Phylum: Arthropoda
- Class: Insecta
- Order: Hymenoptera
- Family: Vespidae
- Subfamily: Eumeninae
- Genus: Pseudabispa; Vecht, 1960

Type species
- Pseudabispa abispoides (Perkins, 1912)

Species
- Pseudabispa abispoides (Perkins, 1912); Pseudabispa bicolor (Saussure, 1855); Pseudabispa confusa Vecht, 1960; Pseudabispa ephippioides Vecht, 1960; Pseudabispa paragioides (Meade-Waldo, 1910)

= Pseudabispa =

Genus of wasps

Pseudabispa is an Australian and Papuan genus of potter wasps containing 5 species, one of them (Pseudabispa bicolor) subdivided in 4 subspecies.
