= Alphamenes =

Scientific classification
- Kingdom: Animalia
- Phylum: Arthropoda
- Clade: Pancrustacea
- Class: Insecta
- Order: Hymenoptera
- Family: Vespidae
- Subfamily: Eumeninae
- Genus: Alphamenes; Vecht, 1977

Species
- Alphamenes campanulatus (Fabricius, 1804); Alphamenes convexus (Fox, 1899); Alphamenes incertus (de Saussure, 1875); Alphamenes insignis (Fox, 1899); Alphamenes richardsi (Soika, 1978); Alphamenes semiplanus (Soika, 1978); Alphamenes usitatus (Fox, 1899)

Genus of wasps

Alphamenes is a small neotropical genus of potter wasps that currently contains 7 species, it was named by the Dutch entomologist Jacobus van der Vecht in 1977.
