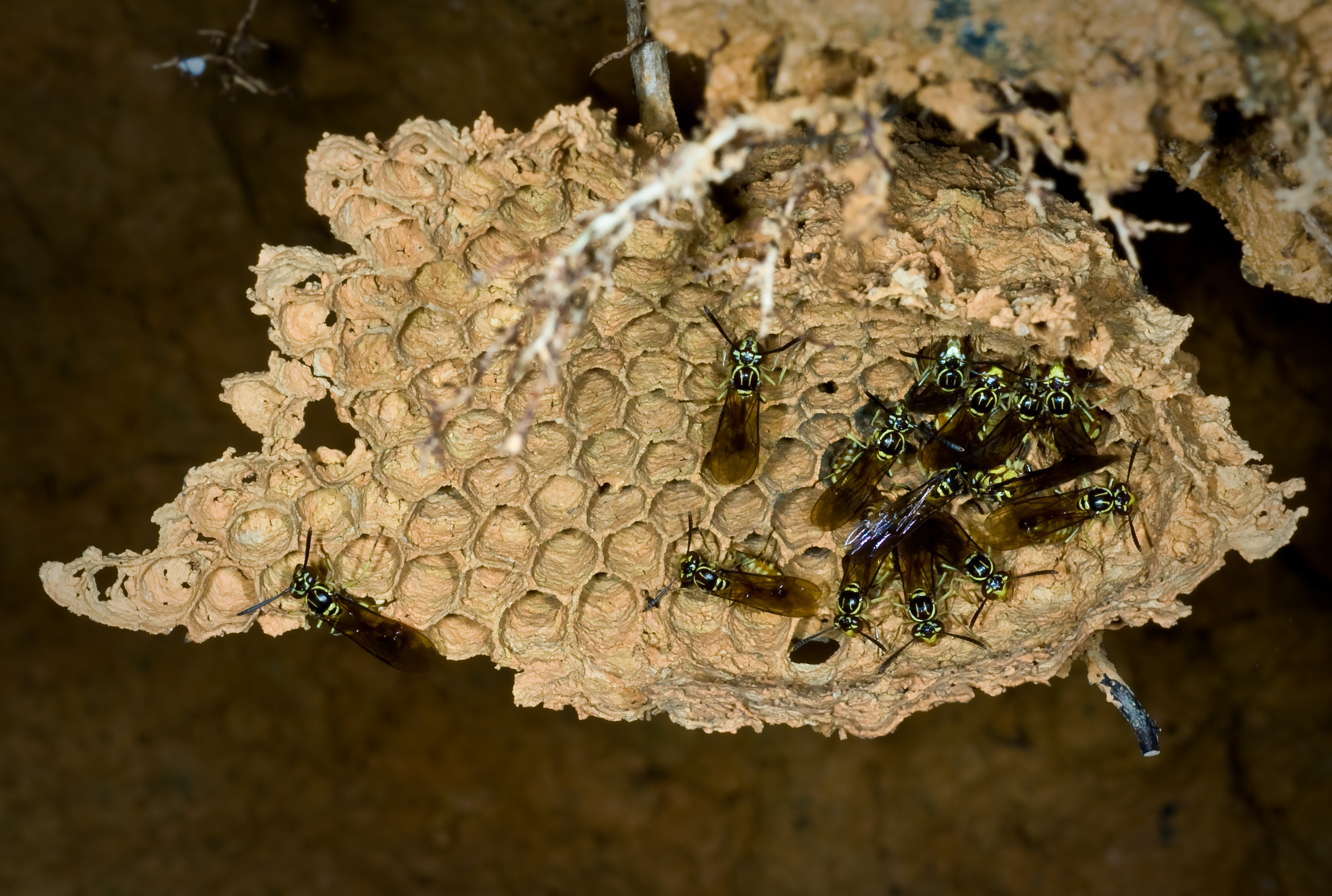
- Liostenogaster flavolineata

Scientific classification
- Domain: Eukaryota
- Kingdom: Animalia
- Phylum: Arthropoda
- Class: Insecta
- Order: Hymenoptera
- Family: Vespidae
- Subfamily: Stenogastrinae
- Genus: Liostenogaster; Vecht, 1969

= Liostenogaster =

Genus of wasps

Liostenogaster is a genus of hover wasps from the subfamily Stenogastrinae of the family Vespidae which has a distribution centred on south-east Asia. It was named by the Dutch entomologist Jacobus van der Vecht from material collected by Japanese scientists on an expedition to Thailand, Malaysia and Cambodia which took place in 1966.

== Species ==
The following species are currently assigned to Liostenogaster:

- Liostenogaster abstrusa Turillazzi 1999
- Liostenogaster bimaculata Selis, 2018
- Liostenogaster campanulae Turillazzi 1999
- Liostenogaster filicis Turillazzi 1999
- Liostenogaster flaviplagiata (Cameron, 1902)
- Liostenogaster flavolineata (Cameron, 1902)
- Liostenogaster maculiceps Selis, 2018
- Liostenogaster nitidipennis (de Saussure, 1853)
- Liostenogaster pardii Turillazzi & Carfi 1996
- Liostenogaster picta (Smith, 1860)
- Liostenogaster topographica Turillazzi 1999
- Liostenogaster tutua Turillazzi 1999
- Liostenogaster variapicta (Rohwer, 1919)
- Liostenogaster vechti Turillazzi 1999
