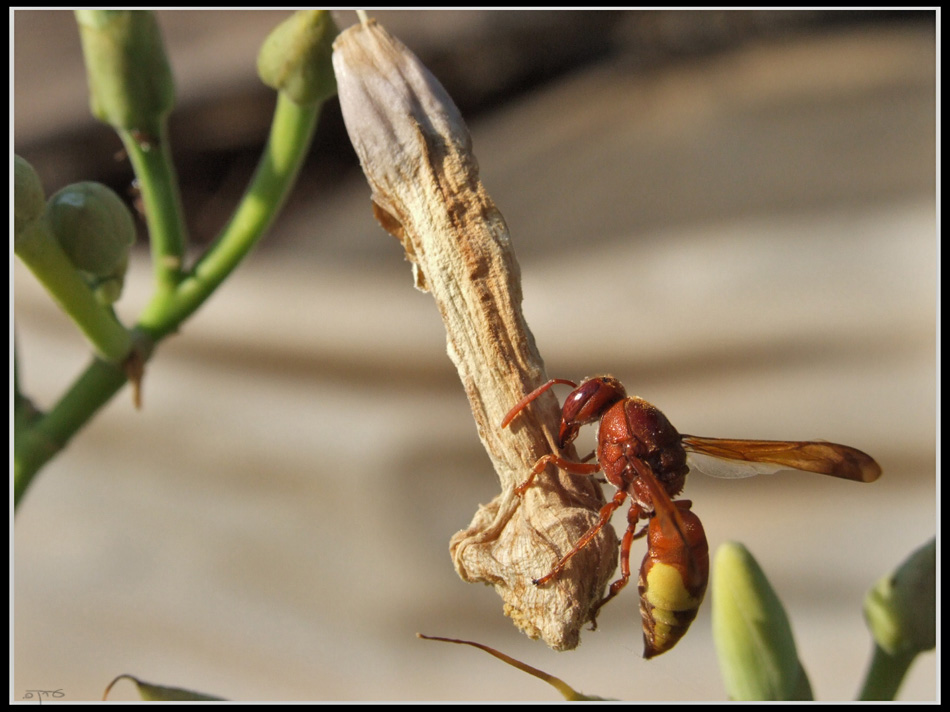
- Rhynchium oculatum

Scientific classification
- Kingdom: Animalia
- Phylum: Arthropoda
- Clade: Pancrustacea
- Class: Insecta
- Order: Hymenoptera
- Family: Vespidae
- Subfamily: Eumeninae
- Genus: Rhynchium; Spinola, 1806

Type species
- Rhynchium oculatum (Fabricius, 1781)

= Rhynchium =

Genus of wasps

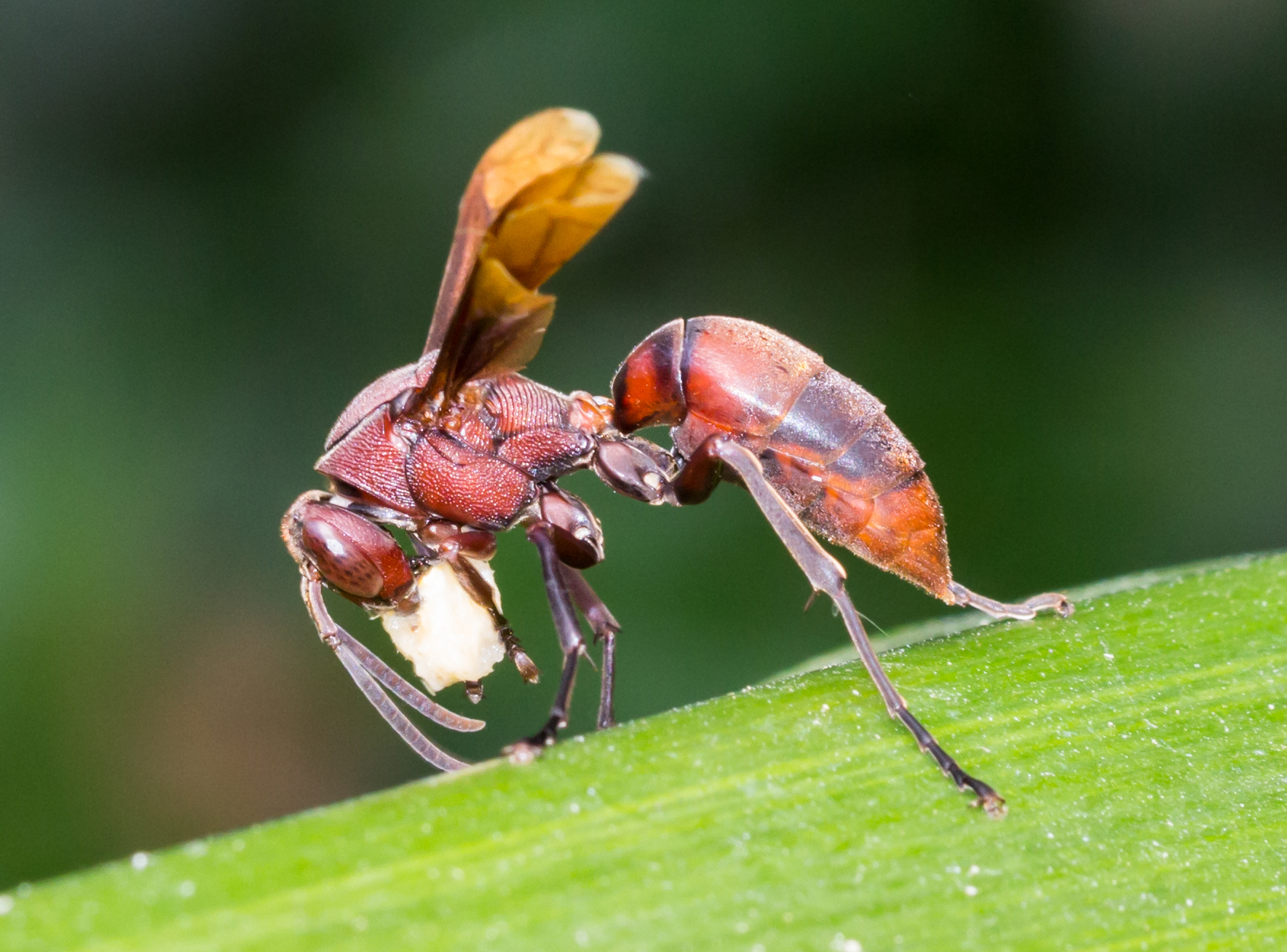
Rhynchium brunneum, Taman Sari, 2014-05-19

Rhynchium is an Australian, Afrotropical, Indomalayan and Palearctic genus of potter wasps.

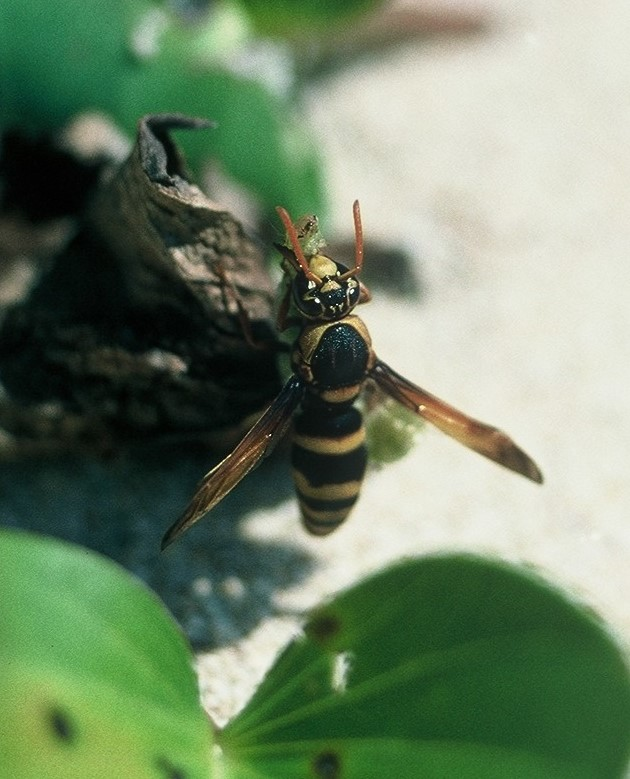
Rhynchium quinquecindum nambui. Iriomote Is., Japan.

== Species ==
Species classified in the genus Rhynchium include:

- Rhynchium acromum Giordani Soika, 1952
- Rhynchium annuliferum Boisduval, 1835
- Rhynchium ardens Smith, 1873
- Rhynchium atrissimum Vecht, 1968
- Rhynchium atrum Saussure, 1852
- Rhynchium australense Perkins, 1914
- Rhynchium bandrense Dusmet, 1930
- Rhynchium bathyxanthum Vecht, 1963
- Rhynchium brunneum (Fabricius, 1793)
- Rhynchium carnaticum (Fabricius, 1798)
- Rhynchium claripenne Giordani Soika, 1994
- Rhynchium collinum Cameron, 1903
- Rhynchium cyanopterum Saussure, 1852
- Rhynchium fervens Walker, 1871
- Rhynchium fukaii Cameron, 1911
- Rhynchium haemorrhoidale (Fabricius, 1775)
- Rhynchium japonicum Dalla Torre, 1894
- Rhynchium khandalense Dusmet, 1930
- Rhynchium kuenckeli Maindron, 1882
- Rhynchium lacuum Stadelmann, 1898
- Rhynchium magnificum Smith, 1869
- Rhynchium marginellum (Fabricius, 1793)
- Rhynchium marianense (Bequaert & Yasumatsu, 1939)
- Rhynchium medium Maindron, 1882
- Rhynchium mirabile Saussure, 1852
- Rhynchium multispinosum (Saussure, 1855)
- Rhynchium neavei Meade-Waldo, 1911
- Rhynchium nigrolimbatum Bingham, 1912
- Rhynchium nigrosericeum Giordani Soika, 1990
- Rhynchium oculatum (Fabricius, 1781)
- Rhynchium patrizii Guiglia, 1931
- Rhynchium proserpina Schulthess, 1923
- Rhynchium quinquecinctum (Fabricius, 1787)
- Rhynchium rubropictum Smith, 1861
- Rhynchium rufiventre Radoszkowski, 1881
- Rhynchium superbum Saussure, 1852
- Rhynchium thomsoni Cameron, 1910
- Rhynchium transvaalensis Cameron, 1910
- Rhynchium usambaraense Cameron, 1910
- Rhynchium varipes Perkins, 1905
- Rhynchium versicolor (Kirby, 1900)
- Rhynchium vittatum Buysson, 1909
- Rhynchium xanthurum Saussure, 1856
- Rhynchium zonatum Walker, 1871
