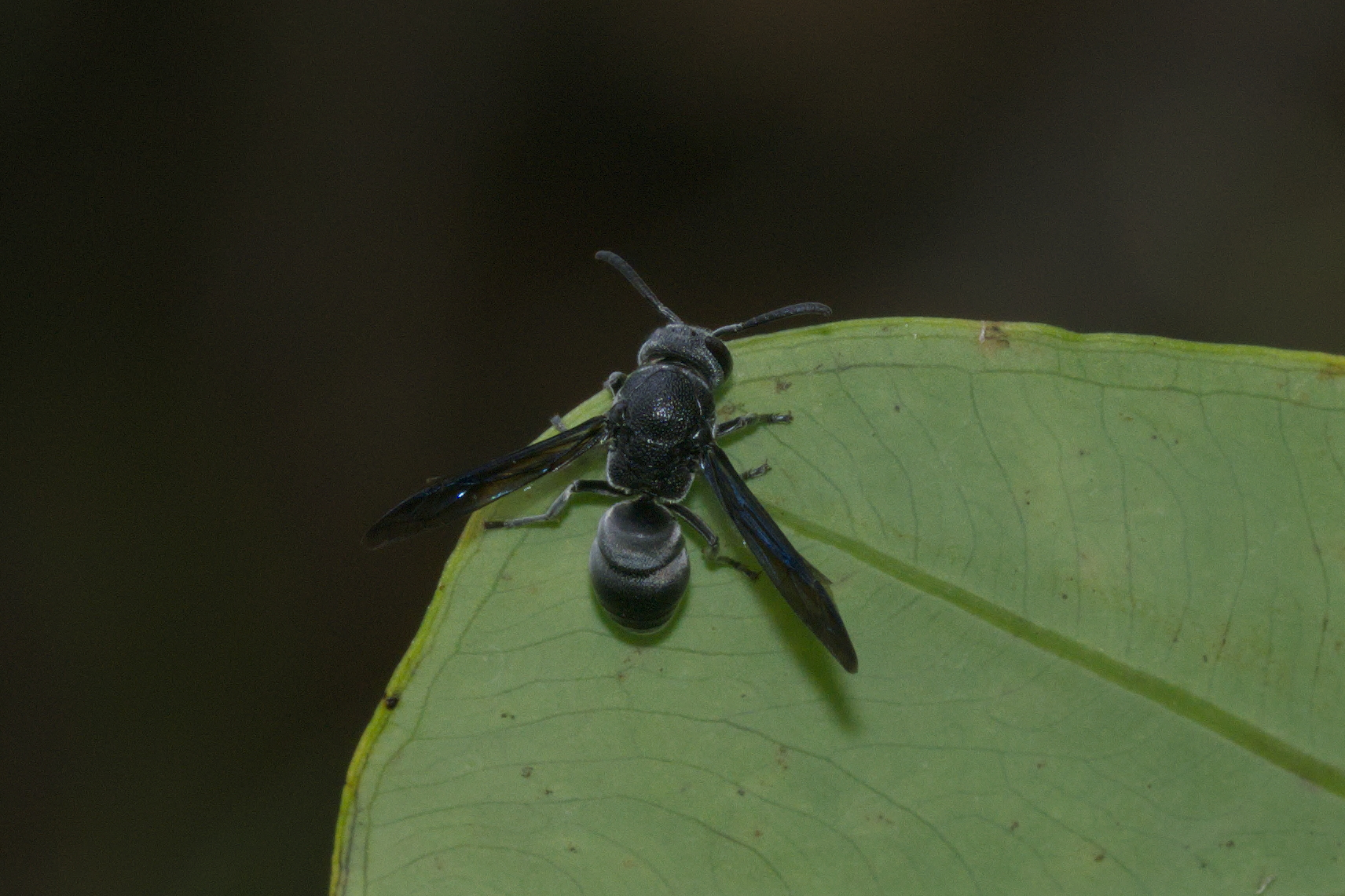
- Allorhynchium sp.

Scientific classification
- Kingdom: Animalia
- Phylum: Arthropoda
- Class: Insecta
- Order: Hymenoptera
- Family: Vespidae
- Subfamily: Eumeninae
- Genus: Allorhynchium; Vecht, 1963

Species
- See text

= Allorhynchium =

Genus of wasps

Allorhynchium is an Indomalayan and Australasian genus of potter wasps.

== Species ==
- Allorhynchium angulatum
- Allorhynchium anomalum
- Allorhynchium argentatum
- Allorhynchium brevilineatum
- Allorhynchium carbonarium
- Allorhynchium cariniventre
- Allorhynchium chinense
- Allorhynchium concolor
- Allorhynchium iridipenne
- Allorhynchium laminatum
- Allorhynchium latum
- Allorhynchium lugubrinum
- Allorhynchium malayanum
- Allorhynchium metallicum
- Allorhynchium moerum
- Allorhynchium obscurum
- Allorhynchium quadrimaculatum
- Allorhynchium quadrituberculatum
- Allorhynchium setosum
- Allorhynchium snelleni
- Allorhynchium vollenhofeni
