= Cyrtolabulus =

Scientific classification
- Domain: Eukaryota
- Kingdom: Animalia
- Phylum: Arthropoda
- Class: Insecta
- Order: Hymenoptera
- Family: Vespidae
- Subfamily: Eumeninae
- Genus: Cyrtolabulus; Vecht, 1969

Species
- See text

Genus of wasps

Cyrtolabulus is an African, Indomalayan and Palearctic genus of potter wasps. It contains the following species:

- Cyrtolabulus angustatus Gusenleitner, 2004
- Cyrtolabulus arcuatus (Giordani Soika, 1944)
- Cyrtolabulus bekilyensis (Giordani Soika, 1941)
- Cyrtolabulus bimaculatus Gusenleitner, 2000
- Cyrtolabulus caputabnormis Gusenleitner, 2000
- Cyrtolabulus carbonarius Giordani Soika, 1989
- Cyrtolabulus chudeaui (R. du Buysson, 1908)
- Cyrtolabulus concavus Giordani Soika, 1983
- Cyrtolabulus conspicuus Gusenleitner, 1999
- Cyrtolabulus elbanus Giordani Soika, 1977
- Cyrtolabulus eremicus (Giordani Soika, 1952)
- Cyrtolabulus exiguus (Saussure, 1852)
- Cyrtolabulus finitimus (Kohl, 1907)
- Cyrtolabulus flavorufus Selis, 2024
- Cyrtolabulus garambensis (Bequaert, 1918)
- Cyrtolabulus gracilis (Kohl, 1906)
- Cyrtolabulus grossepunctatus (Kirby, 1900)
- Cyrtolabulus interstitialis (Cameron, 1902)
- Cyrtolabulus iranus (Giordani Soika, 1968)
- Cyrtolabulus madli Gusenleitner, 1998
- Cyrtolabulus mauretanicus Gusenleitner, 2006
- Cyrtolabulus metatarsalis Gusenleitner, 1998
- Cyrtolabulus minoicus Gusenleitner, 2003
- Cyrtolabulus mochii (Giordani Soika, 1968)
- Cyrtolabulus nigerrimus Gusenleitner, 2002
- Cyrtolabulus occidentalis (Giordani Soika, 1968)
- Cyrtolabulus parvulus Selis, 2024
- Cyrtolabulus pedunculatus (E. Saunders, 1905)
- Cyrtolabulus punctatus (Meade-Waldo, 1910)
- Cyrtolabulus rauschi Gusenleitner, 1999
- Cyrtolabulus reichli Gusenleitner, 1998
- Cyrtolabulus rhodesiensis (Giordani Soika, 1944)
- Cyrtolabulus rhombicus Gusenleitner, 2004
- Cyrtolabulus saharensis (Giordani Soika, 1952)
- Cyrtolabulus scrobalis Selis, 2024
- Cyrtolabulus sexspinosus Giordani Soika, 1977
- Cyrtolabulus socotrae (Kohl, 1906)
- Cyrtolabulus soikai Gusenleitner, 1999
- Cyrtolabulus sollicitus (Giordani Soika, 1941)
- Cyrtolabulus spinithorax (Giordani Soika, 1968)
- Cyrtolabulus striaticlypeus Gusenleitner, 2002
- Cyrtolabulus suavis (Vecht, 1963)
- Cyrtolabulus suboscurus (Giordani Soika, 1941)
- Cyrtolabulus syriacus (Giordani Soika, 1968)
- Cyrtolabulus transversus Giordani Soika, 1987
- Cyrtolabulus tussaci Giordani Soika, 1989
- Cyrtolabulus ulricae Gusenleitner, 1999
- Cyrtolabulus yunnanensis Lee, 1982
- Cyrtolabulus zarudnyi (Kostylev, 1939)
- Cyrtolabulus zavattari (Giordani Soika, 1939)
- Cyrtolabulus zethiformis (Giordani Soika, 1958)
