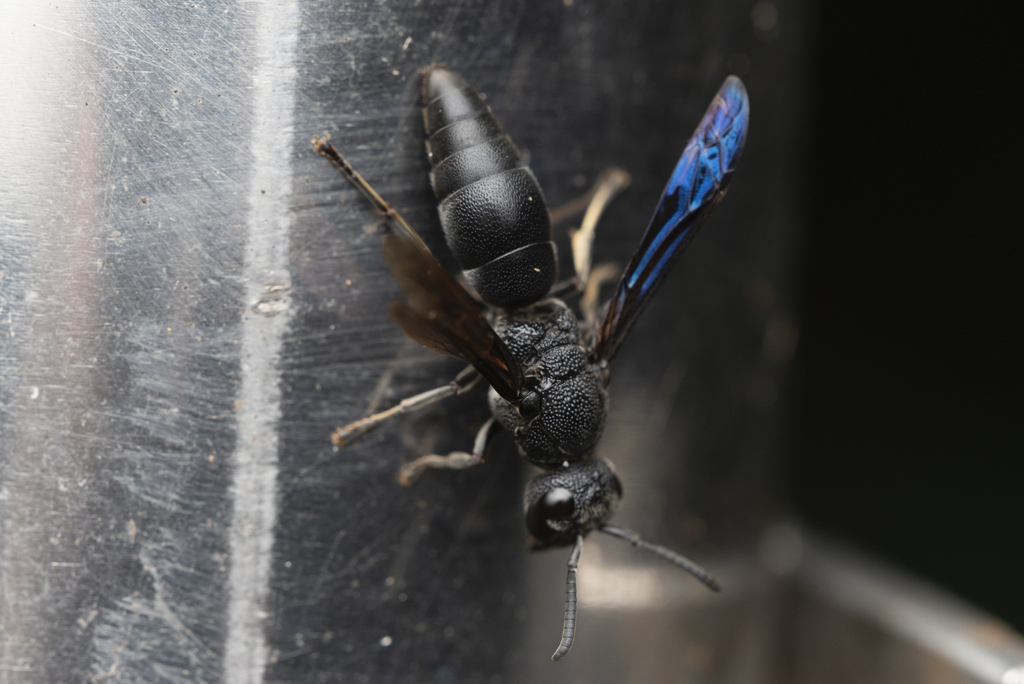

Scientific classification
- Kingdom: Animalia
- Phylum: Arthropoda
- Clade: Pancrustacea
- Class: Insecta
- Order: Hymenoptera
- Family: Vespidae
- Genus: Allorhynchium
- Species: A. chinense

Binomial name
- Allorhynchium chinense (Saussure, 1862)

= Allorhynchium chinense =

Species of wasp

Allorhynchium chinense is a species of Hymenoptera in the family Eumenidae. The species is found in China, Taiwan, Vietnam, and the Philippines. They construct their nest partitions and collars with a resinous material and cells are provisioned with caterpillars of the family Tortricidae.
