= Mitrodynerus =

Scientific classification
- Domain: Eukaryota
- Kingdom: Animalia
- Phylum: Arthropoda
- Class: Insecta
- Order: Hymenoptera
- Family: Vespidae
- Genus: Mitrodynerus; Vecht, 1981
- Species: M. vitripennis

Binomial name
- Mitrodynerus vitripennis Vecht, 1981

Genus of wasps

Mitrodynerus is a monotypic genus of potter wasps with the single member being endemic to Sri Lanka.
