= Allorhynchium laminatum =

Scientific classification
- Kingdom: Animalia
- Phylum: Arthropoda
- Clade: Pancrustacea
- Class: Insecta
- Order: Hymenoptera
- Family: Vespidae
- Genus: Allorhynchium
- Species: A. laminatum

Binomial name
- Allorhynchium laminatum (Gribodo, 1892)

Species of wasp

Allorhynchium laminatum is a species of wasp in the family Vespidae.
