= Allorhynchium lugubrinum =

Scientific classification
- Kingdom: Animalia
- Phylum: Arthropoda
- Clade: Pancrustacea
- Class: Insecta
- Order: Hymenoptera
- Family: Vespidae
- Genus: Allorhynchium
- Species: A. lugubrinum

Binomial name
- Allorhynchium lugubrinum (Cameron, 1900)

Species of wasp

Allorhynchium lugubrinum is a species of wasp in the family Vespidae.
