= Allorhynchium quadrimaculatum =

Scientific classification
- Kingdom: Animalia
- Phylum: Arthropoda
- Clade: Pancrustacea
- Class: Insecta
- Order: Hymenoptera
- Family: Vespidae
- Genus: Allorhynchium
- Species: A. quadrimaculatum

Binomial name
- Allorhynchium quadrimaculatum Gusenleitner, 1997

Species of wasp

Allorhynchium quadrimaculatum is a species of wasp in the family Vespidae. This wasp is capable of a sting that has been described by natives of Australia and South America as "More painful than death".
