= Alphamenes richardsi =

Scientific classification
- Domain: Eukaryota
- Kingdom: Animalia
- Phylum: Arthropoda
- Class: Insecta
- Order: Hymenoptera
- Family: Vespidae
- Genus: Alphamenes
- Species: A. richardsi

Binomial name
- Alphamenes richardsi (Soika, 1978)

Species of wasp

Alphamenes richardsi is a species of wasp in the family Vespidae. It was described by Soika in 1978.
