= Allorhynchium iridipenne =

Scientific classification
- Kingdom: Animalia
- Phylum: Arthropoda
- Clade: Pancrustacea
- Class: Insecta
- Order: Hymenoptera
- Family: Vespidae
- Genus: Allorhynchium
- Species: A. iridipenne

Binomial name
- Allorhynchium iridipenne (Smith, 1861)

Species of wasp

Allorhynchium iridipenne is a species of wasp in the family Vespidae.
