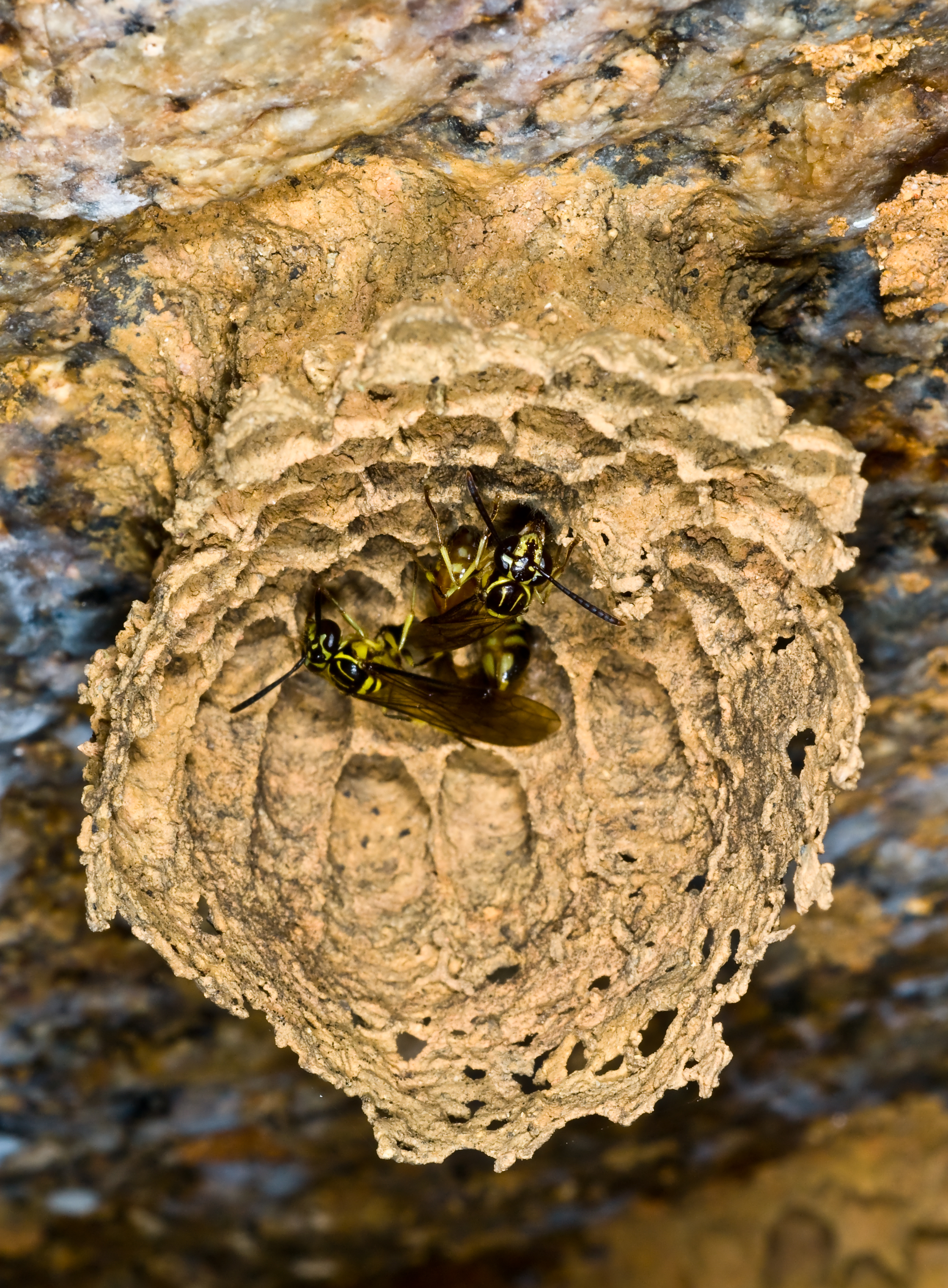

Scientific classification
- Kingdom: Animalia
- Phylum: Arthropoda
- Clade: Pancrustacea
- Class: Insecta
- Order: Hymenoptera
- Family: Vespidae
- Genus: Liostenogaster
- Species: L. flavolineata

Binomial name
- Liostenogaster flavolineata (Cameron 1902)

= Liostenogaster flavolineata =

Tropical Hover Wasp

Species of wasp

Liostenogaster flavolineata (tropical hover wasp) is an insect that belongs to the wasp family Vespidae. This hairy-faced hover wasp species is predominantly found in South Asian rain forests, especially in Malaysia. Individual colonies of this species are very small, but aggregations of nests allow for interactions between many smaller colonies. Some worker wasps, known as "helpers", will move between multiple nests in an attempt to improve their position in the dominance hierarchy. Its nests are pale-colored and are usually built with mud.Liostenogaster flavolineata is one of the most studied species in the Stenogastrinae.

== Taxonomy and phylogeny ==
Liostenogaster flavolineata is in the vespid subfamily Stenogastrinae, which is composed of about 58 different species of hover wasps in 7 genera (Anischnogaster, Liostenogaster, Eustenogaster, Stenogaster, Parischnogaster, Metischnogaster and Coclischnogaster). Like other hover wasp species belonging to this subfamily, Liostenogaster flavolineata is known for its small colonies and primitive social organization.

== Description and identification ==
Hairy-faced hover wasps live in small groups that consist of one to ten females. Since these wasps are located in the Southeast Asian rainforest, they are not subjected to seasonal variations in climate, other than rainfall. Individual nests are commonly found in aggregations.

=== Queen ===
The queen is usually the founder of the nest and is the sole egg layer. In existing nests there is a phenomenon where an age hierarchy determines who will become the queen. When the current queen dies the next oldest helper will become the new queen. Since queens do not possess any morphological characteristics that make them distinct from workers, any worker may become queen.

=== Helpers ===
In each nest there are about 7 to 9 helper wasps who are female and are also capable of reproducing. Because Liostenogaster flavolineata is a primitive eusocial species the female offspring get to decide if they will stay in their mother's nest and become helpers or if they will become floaters.

=== Floaters ===
Due to the fact that Liostenogaster flavolineata also live in aggregations where there may be up to 100 different nests located in proximity, some females, called "floaters" may decide to leave their nest and either go off to become helpers in other nests or try to found their own nests.

=== Males ===
Males leave the nest as soon as they reach adulthood.

=== Nest ===
Liostenogaster flavolineata build energetically costly mud nests that have a pale color. Each nest comprises about 90 to 100 combs. Like other species in the Stenogastrinae, their nests do not have a petiole, which is unusual among social wasps. Their nests are also open so they must build them in protected places like under rocks or under bridges.

== Distribution and habitat ==
=== Habitat ===
Liostenogaster flavolineata live in South East Asian tropical areas. Like Liostenogaster vechti, Liostenogaster flavolineata wasps prefer places with moisture and natural protection. These wasps are primarily studied in Malaysia, and area which has a typical wet and dry season.

=== Nest building ===
Nests are built under rocks or bridges with water nearby. They are made completely out of mud. Nests are made to house many more wasps than they actually do. Each nest is very underpopulated but it is not fully understood why this is the case. Currently it is believed that female helpers would rather become floaters than be a low ranked helper so most of them will leave the nest. There is also a small chance that a floater will be successful in usurping the position of a wasp in another nest.

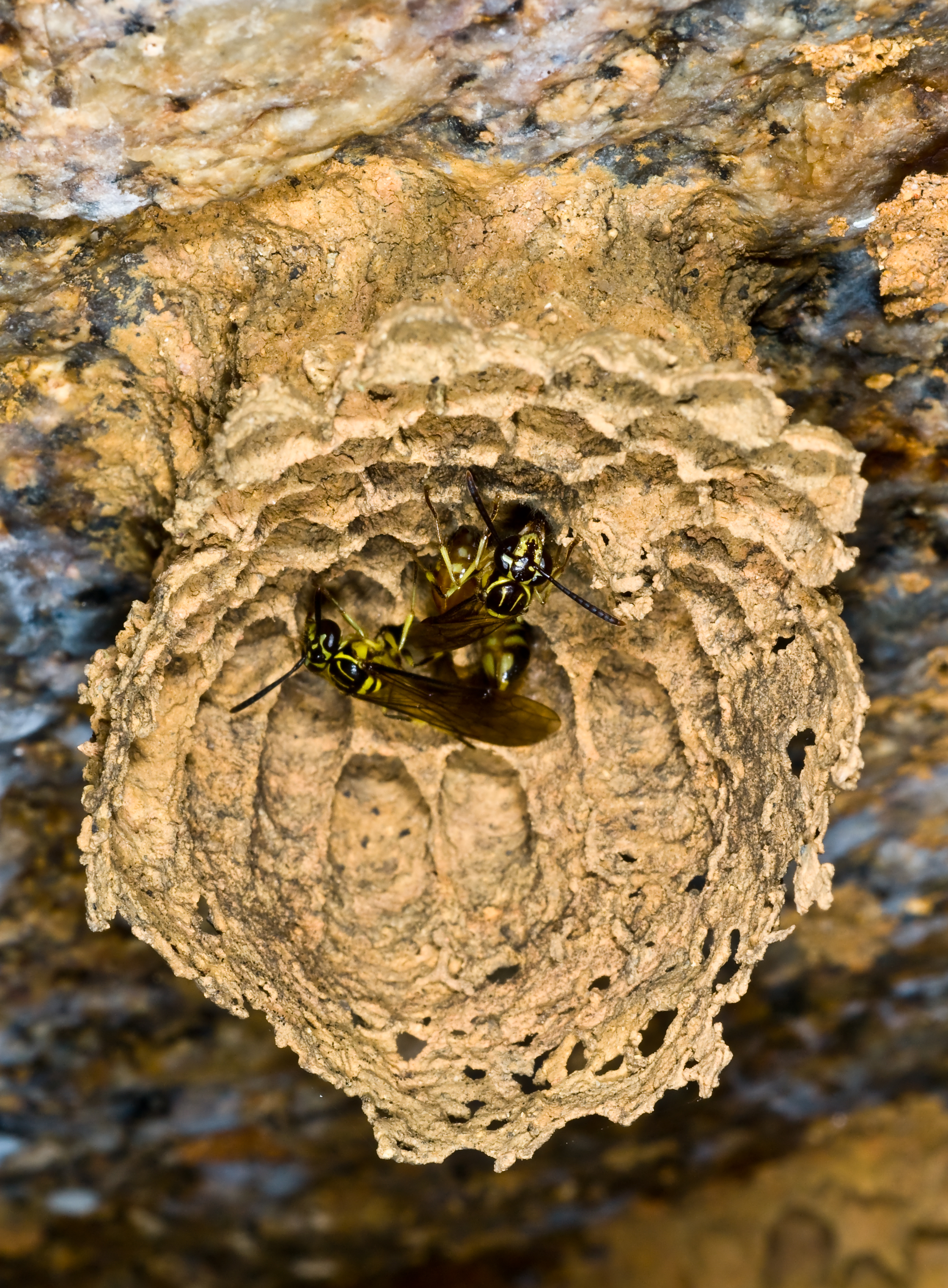
Small colony with two females of L. flavolineata built under a rock (Pahang State, Peninsular Malaysia).

== Colony cycle ==
Since Liostenogaster flavolineata is located in a tropical climate it is aseasonal and does not have a colony cycle, and does not have any specific timing for building new nests or breeding. New nests are based on a cost-benefit system for individual females. A colony can be potentially reused for years as long as it is not destroyed by weather or natural predators. Because new nests are energetically costly, most females become queens by waiting on their turn in the age hierarchy. More than 50% of individual female foundings fail, so it is more beneficial to either stay and become a helper or to become a floater and find a new established nest. This is possible because Liostenogaster flavolineata has a ranking system for choosing the next queen, where the next oldest becomes the queen. This ranking system is based on a dominance hierarchy which is covered in the following sections. New colonies are started when a female helper decides to leave her nest and found a new nest.

=== Nesting demographics ===
A new colony is formed by a single fertilized female who builds a small nest, in which she will lay a small number of eggs (typically only 9 to 10). As the nest continues to grow, the number of females in the colony will remain fairly constant. Individual nests do not have more than about ten individuals but these wasps sometimes build nests very close to each other (called nest aggregations). While there may be only a few individuals in each nest, there can potentially be hundreds of individuals in an aggregation.

== Behavior ==
=== Dominance hierarchy ===
In Liostenogaster flavolineata, dominance is determined by age. Once the first female founder queen dies, dominance in the nest is then transferred to the next oldest female in the colony. There is not much competition between females wasps of the same nest for dominance; however, workers do face competition from floater wasps who travel between nests. This is because most floater wasps leave their nest seeking better positions in another nest. Wasps who rank higher in the hierarchy spend less time foraging outside the nest, which increases an individual's chance of survival by minimizing the energy cost associated with foraging.

=== Division of labor ===
The females that do not currently hold the position of queen but remain in the nest are called helpers, and the labor of foraging is divided amongst them. Foraging has a high energetic cost, so this task is given to the lowest ranking individuals in the nest. Because increased rates of foraging usually lead to decreased rates of survival, many low ranked females will leave the nest in hopes of finding a nest where they can achieve a rank.

=== Displays of aggression ===
Liostenogaster flavolineata are usually only aggressive when another floater female enters the nest and threatens the established age hierarchy. The females in line to become the queen will attack a new female that threatens their position in the hierarchy.

== Kin selection ==
=== Kin recognition and discrimination ===
The nests of a Liostenogaster flavolineata are covered in a distinct mixture of cuticular hydrocarbons similar to those found on the cuticle of wasp members. It has been found that this specific nest odor is learned after wasps first emerge from the nest. Wasps are then able to use this scent for comparison to distinguish between members of their own colony and wasps from alien colonies. Members of the nest react aggressively towards alien wasps without the familiar, distinct odor that enter their nest. They are also able to use this scent to locate their own nest. In addition, female L. flavolineata produce secretions from their Dufour’s gland that also contain compounds that occur in the cuticle.
