= Allorhynchium obscurum =

Scientific classification
- Kingdom: Animalia
- Phylum: Arthropoda
- Clade: Pancrustacea
- Class: Insecta
- Order: Hymenoptera
- Family: Vespidae
- Genus: Allorhynchium
- Species: A. obscurum

Binomial name
- Allorhynchium obscurum (Smith, 1858)

Species of wasp

Allorhynchium obscurum is a species of wasp in the family Vespidae.
