= Allorhynchium malayanum =

Scientific classification
- Kingdom: Animalia
- Phylum: Arthropoda
- Clade: Pancrustacea
- Class: Insecta
- Order: Hymenoptera
- Family: Vespidae
- Genus: Allorhynchium
- Species: A. malayanum

Binomial name
- Allorhynchium malayanum Gusenleitner, 2000

Species of wasp

Allorhynchium malayanum is a species of wasp in the Vespidae family.
