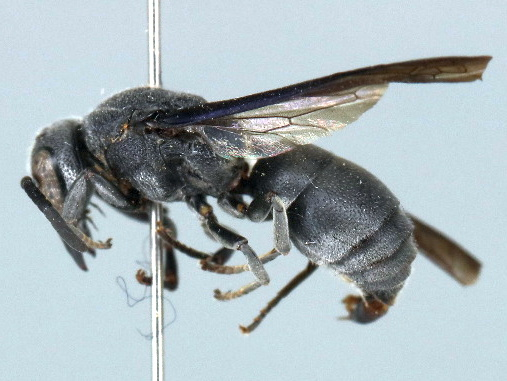

Scientific classification
- Kingdom: Animalia
- Phylum: Arthropoda
- Clade: Pancrustacea
- Class: Insecta
- Order: Hymenoptera
- Family: Vespidae
- Genus: Allorhynchium
- Species: A. argentatum

Binomial name
- Allorhynchium argentatum (Fabricius, 1804)

= Allorhynchium argentatum =

Species of wasp

Allorhynchium argentatum is a species of wasp in the family Vespidae.
