= Alphamenes usitatus =

Scientific classification
- Domain: Eukaryota
- Kingdom: Animalia
- Phylum: Arthropoda
- Class: Insecta
- Order: Hymenoptera
- Family: Vespidae
- Genus: Alphamenes
- Species: A. usitatus

Binomial name
- Alphamenes usitatus (Fox, 1899)

Species of wasp

Alphamenes usitatus is a species of wasp in the family Vespidae. It was described by Fox in 1899.
