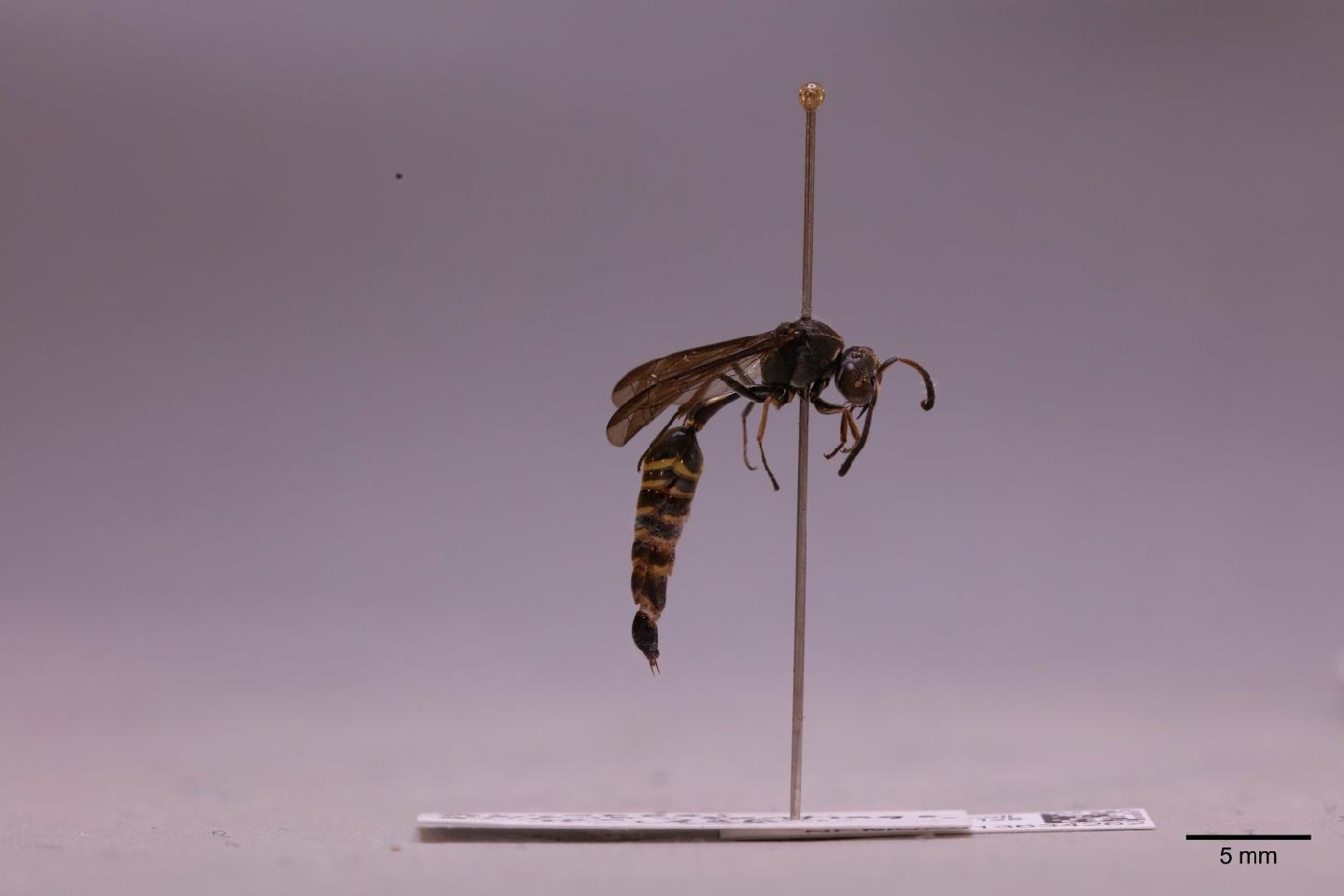

Scientific classification
- Kingdom: Animalia
- Phylum: Arthropoda
- Clade: Pancrustacea
- Class: Insecta
- Order: Hymenoptera
- Family: Vespidae
- Genus: Alphamenes
- Species: A. convexus

Binomial name
- Alphamenes convexus (Fox, 1899)

= Alphamenes convexus =

Species of wasp

Alphamenes convexus is a species of wasp in the family Vespidae. It was described by American entomologist William J. Fox in 1899.
