= Allorhynchium quadrituberculatum =

Scientific classification
- Kingdom: Animalia
- Phylum: Arthropoda
- Clade: Pancrustacea
- Class: Insecta
- Order: Hymenoptera
- Family: Vespidae
- Genus: Allorhynchium
- Species: A. quadrituberculatum

Binomial name
- Allorhynchium quadrituberculatum (Schulthess, 1913)

Synonyms
- Allorhynchium violaceipenne Gusenleitner, 2003

Species of wasp

Allorhynchium quadrituberculatum is a species of wasp in the family Vespidae.
