= Alphamenes campanulatus =

Scientific classification
- Domain: Eukaryota
- Kingdom: Animalia
- Phylum: Arthropoda
- Class: Insecta
- Order: Hymenoptera
- Family: Vespidae
- Genus: Alphamenes
- Species: A. campanulatus

Binomial name
- Alphamenes campanulatus (Fabricius, 1804)

Species of wasp

Alphamenes campanulatus is a species of wasp in the family Vespidae. It was described by Johan Christian Fabricius in 1804.
