= Alphamenes incertus =

Scientific classification
- Domain: Eukaryota
- Kingdom: Animalia
- Phylum: Arthropoda
- Class: Insecta
- Order: Hymenoptera
- Family: Vespidae
- Genus: Alphamenes
- Species: A. incertus

Binomial name
- Alphamenes incertus (de Saussure, 1875)

Species of wasp

Alphamenes incertus is a species of wasp in the family Vespidae. It was described by de Saussure in 1875.
