= Liostenogaster vechti =

Scientific classification
- Kingdom: Animalia
- Phylum: Arthropoda
- Clade: Pancrustacea
- Class: Insecta
- Order: Hymenoptera
- Family: Vespidae
- Genus: Liostenogaster
- Species: L. vechti

Binomial name
- Liostenogaster vechti (Turillazzi, 1988)

Species of wasp

Liostenogaster vechti is a type of eusocial hover wasp within the family Vespidae. They are typically brown and yellow in color and are considered a passive aggressive species. Their stings are less painful to humans than other social wasps, and they engage in associative nest foundation. They are mostly found on the Malaysian peninsula and are known for living in large clusters of small ring-shaped nests.

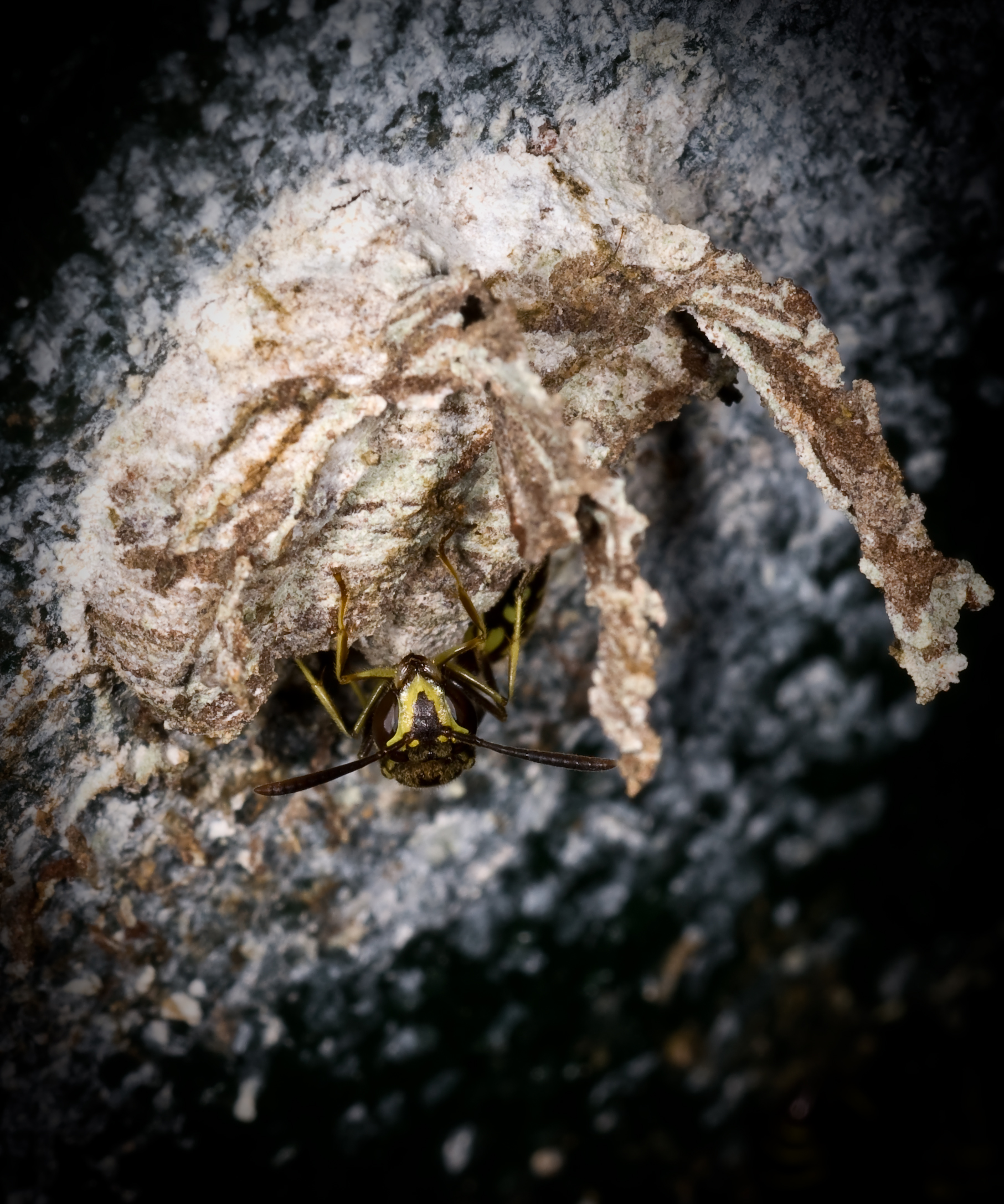
Young colony of Liostenogaster vechti. Peninsular Malaysia

== Taxonomy and phylogeny ==
Liostenogaster vechti was first classified by Stefano Turillazzi in 1988. These wasps are part of the subfamily Stenogastrinae and are often referred to as hover wasps due to their manner of flying. Stenogastrinae has many other groups that are distributed across the Oriental region, but the species most closely associated with L. vechti is L. flavolineata due to similar coloring, behavioral patterns, and the similar locations of the two species.

== Description and identification ==
The adult females are 14 to 16 mm in length with dark brown coloring and yellow markings all over the body. The abdomen has brown and yellow stripes with the tip being mostly dark brown, and the legs are typically lighter at the bottom and browner near the top. Their mandibles are also yellow and each have three teeth (tridentate) which are not yellow. The antennae are partially dark brown and the eyes are dark brown and hairless unlike the hairy eyes of L. flavolineata. The top of the thorax is usually dark brown with the rest of the thorax having yellow and brown intermediate patches, and the petiole (slender stalk connecting the abdomen to the thorax) is usually a reddish brown. They also have two sets of wings, two posterior and anterior.

The adult males look very similar to the females. They have about the same body length, and the main differences include their antennae being completely dark brown, and having hair on the broad yellow plate (clypeus) at the front of their heads. They have more hair in other places as well. Also, their upper hind limbs (femora) on their median legs are brown with a thin, long, yellow stripe. Lastly, the aedeagus (reproductive organ which is used to secrete sperm) is flattened and inflated at the apex.

== Habitat and distribution ==
Along with most other members of the Stenogastrinae, L. vechti are only located in Southeast Asian rainforests. These wasps along with L. flavolineata are mostly distributed in the Malaysian peninsula. Their nests are located in large clusters and are usually found on flat, vertical, or horizontal substrates.

== Colony cycle ==
Colonies are often founded by a group of L. vechti females using what is known as associative foundation. They begin by constructing small nests in the center, and eventually other wasps join the colony and build nests around the initial central one. The nests last for multiple years, and colonies grow and contain up to 600 nests or more. Temperature does not play a serious limiting factor in the lives of these wasps, and there is no particular season during which the colonies of these wasps are not present and active. However, brood rearing and reproduction is more likely to occur during the dry season, and the population of the nest tends to increase during that time as well, although brood rearing and reproduction also occurs during the wet season.

Nests are sometimes destroyed by predators or by other environmental factors such as floods and earth slides, but new nests are continually built around the old nests. Each nest usually contains relatively few individuals (usually no more than 10) and there are usually more females than males. There is typically one dominant reproductive female per nest, and after her daughters mature, they stay with their mother in her nest for a short while and engage in nest defense, brood care, or foraging activities. After this period ends, daughters often leave and join other colonies. Occasionally, dominant females are usurped by other visiting dominants. A new reproductive female may arrive, fight the current dominant female, and take over the nest if she (the newcomer) wins.

== Nests ==
=== Nest building ===
L. vechti build their nests in sheltered areas on flat, vertical, or horizontal surfaces (such as on the faces of overhanging rocks). They begin by building cells one next to the other in a row by using bits of vegetation. Once they have finished the initial row, they will often build a second row atop the first one and possibly even a third row if conditions are especially crowded. The wasps occasionally build nests that form a complete ring which have no more than 40 cells in one row, but usually the nests resemble an open ring with the open cells facing the center. This has caused the nests to be characterized as "bracket-like" or "horseshoe-like." The cells also face slightly downward to prevent raindrops from landing inside of the nests, and the nests usually contain a couple of protruding points which the wasps use as locations upon which to land. Most nests are small, but the nests are built in clusters that range from only having a few nests to containing hundreds.

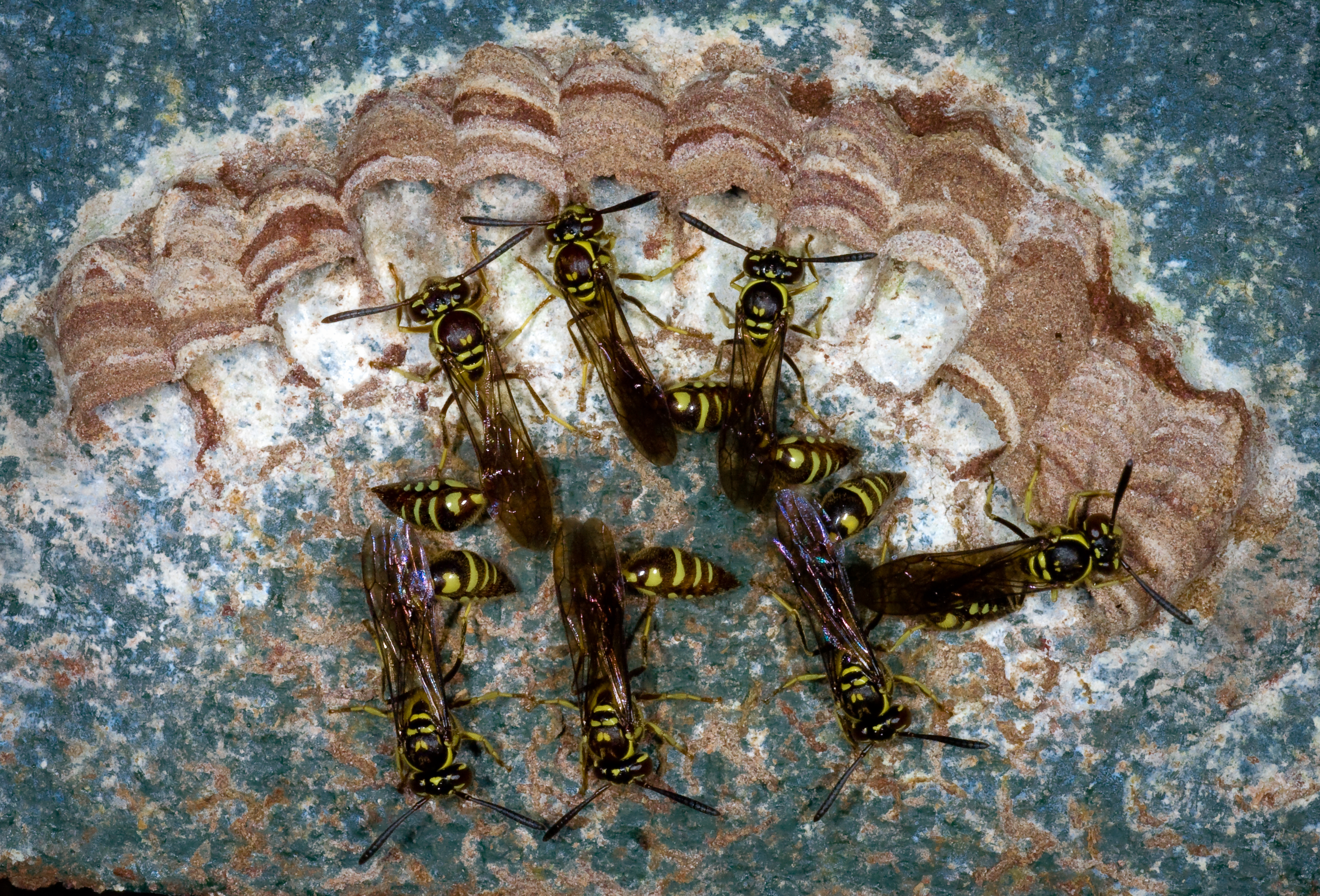
Paper nest of aL. vechti colony. Peninsular Malaysia

Nests are also built to take advantage of camouflage and concealment techniques to avoid predation. Old nests that are no longer used are not completely torn down or abandoned but combined with other functioning nests to form a pattern that often contributes to predator confusion.

=== Colony behavior ===
At sunrise, the population of wasps currently on the nest drops to around 60%. This percentage remains about the same throughout the day as different wasps return and leave for various reasons, and the number increases to about 90% as night falls. However, the number never reaches 100% because some individuals do not return during the night.

When on the nest, the majority of the wasps spend their time resting. This posture usually includes holding the abdomen to one side, and individuals will often lie on top of each other while resting. Most activity seems to be concentrated in the middle of the day, including egg-laying and abdominal pap collection.

Throughout the day, some wasps return to their own nests, while others appear to "visit" or "inspect" other nests. They do this by either approaching other nests, touching other nests, or directly landing on the nests. Responses to these visitors by wasps that actually reside on these nests range from ignoring the newcomers, accepting the newcomers, or threatening and attacking the intruders. Falling fights and other more aggressive defensive maneuvers are more frequent on nests located in the center of the clusters. This suggests that while all the nests are defended, central nests are defended more aggressively, even against visitors.

=== Spatial arrangement ===
Clusters are often built in an oval shape starting from the center. The center is the most coveted space, so the nests tend to be more concentrated and often smaller and older in these areas. These central nests are also more likely to have completely closed rings rather than open rings. Many nests on the periphery are larger, younger, and contain more cells, and foundations are also mainly found near the peripheries. Also, because clusters last for more than one year and some nests are destroyed during that time, signs of older nests are also more concentrated near the middle.

=== Costs and benefits of group living ===
Unlike wasps in the subfamily Polistinae, Stenogastrinae are unable to construct peduncles for their nests. Being forced to choose sites with already made suspensions severely limits their options for suitable nesting sites. This also provides a reasonable explanation for why wasps belonging to this family tend to nest in clusters. When one suitable site is located, many wasps can benefit from the same site.

However, there are obvious costs to group living as well. The larger the cluster, the more visible the cluster becomes and the more obvious it is to predators. While the nests do tend to blend in well with the surrounding environment, predators notice the nests, return repeatedly to the same clusters, and use them as a ready food source.

Also, the nests located near the periphery are more likely to be attacked than the ones in the center which are usually completely surrounded by other nests. This is an example of the selfish herd theory and demonstrates how individuals may cluster together for protection against predators, but the ones in the middle tend to be safer than those on the outside. However, each colony is more prone to attack if the colony next to it is attacked. This is an example of the attacked neighbor risk and reduces some of the benefit gained by participating in selfish herd tactics.

== Reproduction ==
=== Egg-laying ===
As is characteristic of Stenogastrinae, L. vechti secrete a type of gelatinous substance (which is produced by the Dufour’s gland) from their abdomens, which they use to care for the offspring and to lay their eggs. The females collect the pap with their front legs and then hold it in their mouths while they lay eggs, and pap collection is performed before and after each egg is laid.

Egg-laying is done by bringing the abdomen close to the mouthparts where the pap is being held. The female holds her front legs up and open and appears to use them to touch her abdomen. Her antennae are completely still and her wings are closed during the operation. Then her abdomen begins to vibrate, and her sting is turned inside and out and folded backwards. During this process, the egg is expelled and placed directly on the pap that the female is holding in her mouth. She does not touch it with her legs at all. Then her abdomen relaxes and the female places the egg inside the cell. The average length of the eggs laid by L. vechti is 1.36 mm, and ovarian eggs are considered ready to be laid once they reach 1.16 mm.

=== Development ===
L. vechti go through four larval instars (developmental stages), with possibly a 5th initial instar, and the total developmental period lasts over 100 days. As the larvae mature, they develop salivary glands, and afterwards they enter a pupal stage which can last for over 36 days. After individuals emerge from their cells, they spend a few days residing on their nests before engaging in normal nest behavior such as nest defense, or before becoming foragers and retrieving food for the colony.

=== Genetic relatedness ===
Like most hover wasps, L. vechti reproductive females mate singly and are therefore more closely related to the brood than any of the other nestmates are. This is especially true considering that most of the daughters leave the nest, and the current nestmates are often not related to the queen.

== Behavior ==
=== Feeding ===
L. vechti frequently request trophallaxis from other members within their colonies. This behavior is most exhibited whenever a forager returns to the colony. A fellow colony member may solicit food from the individual in a variety of ways. The solicitor may approach the forager and bite her on her clypeus or her mouthparts. The two wasps may also push their heads against each other as if they are fighting. While this happens, they either do not move their antennae or hold them quivering to one side, and their abdomens are pointed downwards slightly. A wasp might also solicit food by rubbing the sides of the other individual's head with her front legs and flapping her wings vigorously. Trophallaxis usually happens too quickly to be observed, and a forager will often leave the nest a few seconds after arriving because she is often rushed by many wasps at the same time. Foragers also often return with insects (such as ants or termites) which they have chewed up and feed to the larvae.

=== Signaling ===
Nestmate recognition and the establishment of reproductive status and dominance are often maintained through facial markings and chemical signaling. The bodies of L. vechti are covered by a mixture of cuticular lipids and long hydrocarbons. Females with ovarian development have much more of a particular hydrocarbon on their cuticles than females with undeveloped ovaries. This hydrocarbon appears to be a type of fertility signal which fertilized females use to show their status.

The size of the brown facial markings on the heads of females also serves as a visual cue for members of the colony and serves as a badge of higher ranking status and reproductive status. Females with larger brown facial markings also have larger ovaries. These visual cues help other wasps to not only determine if a wasp is of the same species, but also to determine what to do and how to distribute themselves around the nests. Visiting females that lack these brown visual marks are more likely to be accepted into foreign nests. Acts of aggressions are much more likely to be exhibited towards a female with these distinctive markings in order to maintain a control system within the nest.

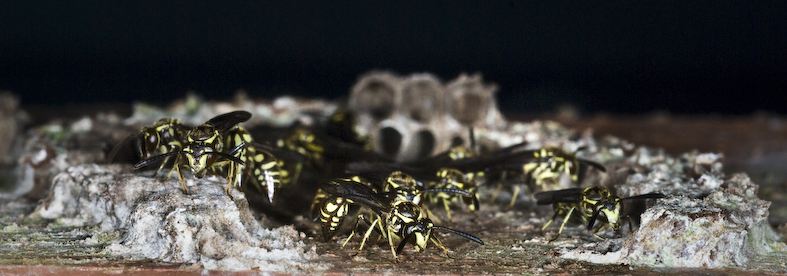
In the foreground of the photo, you can appreciate the difference in the size of the facial marking of three females.

=== Division of labor ===
Each individual nest usually contains one dominant female with well-developed ovaries. This female spends the majority of time on the nest and engages in egg-laying and abdominal pap collection. Other females act as foragers and spend most of their time away from the nest. These females are usually not fertilized and have very poor ovarian development.

=== Dominance ===
The most acts of dominance are usually performed by females with the highest ovarian indices. They will sometimes bite a subordinate’s face and sometimes flap their wings. The subordinate will often lower its head, cease voluntary movement, and sometimes even release a drop of liquid from its abdomen as a deferential act. The dominant wasp ceases movement of her own antennae and may or may not accept the drop.

=== Fighting ===
When disputes occur within the nests, individuals may fight each other to determine dominance. Two wasps may engage in this activity by holding their antennae out-stretched, grasping each other, and falling from the nest. The wasps never actually hit the ground. Instead they separate in mid-air, return to the nest, and repeat this process until a winner is determined. This behavior is especially likely in the event that a stranger attempts to take over a nest while the dominant female is away. When the dominant female returns, she will "fight" this individual, often for several hours and possibly even a couple days, to determine who will be in charge of the nest.

== Predators and defense ==
When an individual of L. vechti feels threatened, it will assume a menacing stance by bending its abdomen to one side and pointing the tip in the direction of its challenger. It does this so that it is prepared to sting its opponent if necessary and thrust its abdomen toward the intruder in what is known as an abdominal slap.

The main predators of these wasps are hornets (especially Vespa tropica), ichneumonid flies, and ants. The hornets attack and damage the nests by ripping the cells apart with their mandibles and then extracting portions of the brood. Raided nests can easily be identified by locating cells that have been ripped or torn. When a hornet or other flying predator approaches, the wasps engage in aerial attacks by throwing themselves into the air in the direction of the potential danger. They actually engage in this behavior very frequently and do so in response to any insect of similar size to hornets that approaches the nests in a questionable manner. When ants approach or invade the nests, the wasps will either grab the ants and drag them away from the nests, or, if the ants are especially large, the wasps will first assume a defensive posture, seize the ants, and then purposely fall out of the nests to ensure the ants are removed. Spiders may also prey on these wasps, but they are much more likely to catch solitary individuals away from the nest.

=== Venom ===
Although they have effective stingers, these wasps and other members of Stenogastrinae are typically passive aggressive. Their stings are less painful for humans than those of many other social wasps, and often when faced with a large threat, these wasps will simply fall passively out of their nests. This behavior actually makes it harder for the potential predator to determine the location of the nest.
