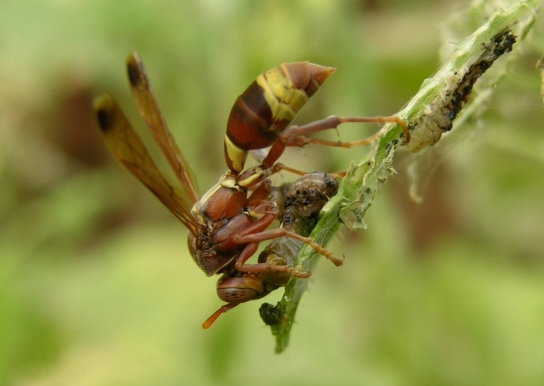
- P. stigma tamulus

Scientific classification
- Kingdom: Animalia
- Phylum: Arthropoda
- Class: Insecta
- Order: Hymenoptera
- Family: Vespidae
- Subfamily: Polistinae
- Genus: Polistes
- Species: P. stigma

Binomial name
- Polistes stigma Fabricius, 1793

= Polistes stigma =

Species of wasp

Polistes stigma is a species of paper wasp from the Paleotropics.

== Distribution ==
P. stigma is widely distributed from India south to Australia and east to Taiwan and Fiji.

== Subspecies ==
Of 19 described subspecies, most are island endemics. The exceptions are P. s. bernardii in Australia and New Guinea, P. s. stigma in Mainland Southeast Asia and Indonesia, P. s. townsvillensis in Australia and P. s. tamulus in India and Sri Lanka.

- Polistes stigma alagari Petersen, 1987
- Polistes stigma bernardii Le Guillou, 1841
- Polistes stigma dubius de Saussure, 1867
- Polistes stigma galatheae Petersen, 1987
- Polistes stigma goestai Petersen, 1987
- Polistes stigma jani Petersen, 1987
- Polistes stigma maculipennis de Saussure, 1853
- Polistes stigma madsi Petersen, 1987
- Polistes stigma manillensis de Saussure, 1853
- Polistes stigma nebulosus Yamane & Kusigemati, 1985
- Polistes stigma novarae de Saussure, 1867
- Polistes stigma papuanus Schulz, 1905
- Polistes stigma pouli Petersen, 1987
- Polistes stigma sauiensis Petersen, 1987
- Polistes stigma stigma (Fabricius, 1793)
- Polistes stigma svendi Petersen, 1987
- Polistes stigma tamulus (Fabricius, 1798)
- Polistes stigma townsvillensis Giordani Soika, 1975
- Polistes stigma tualensis Petersen, 1987

== Gallery ==
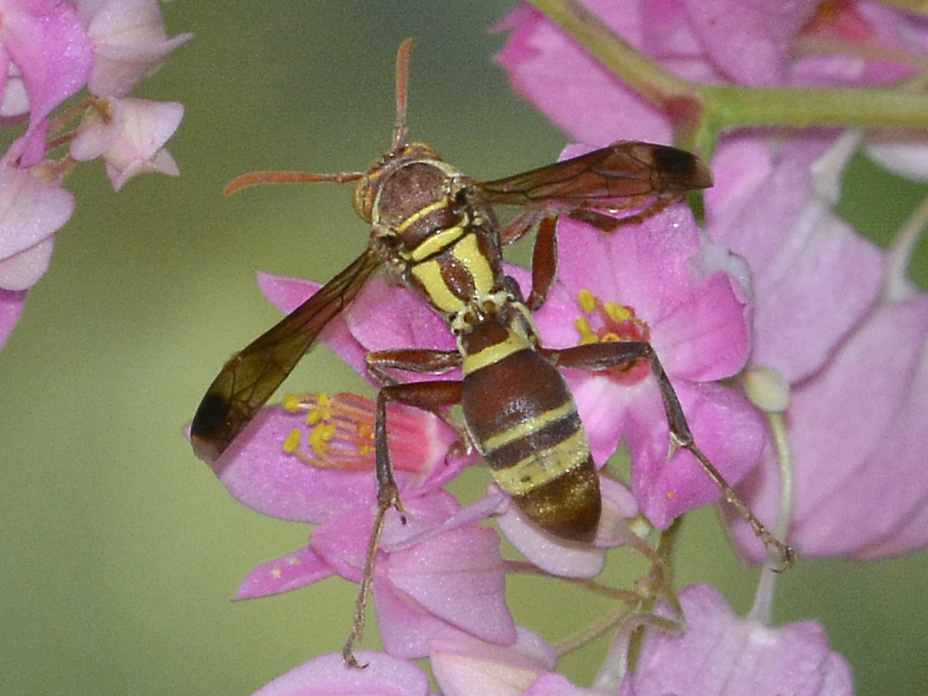
P. s. bernardii in Australia

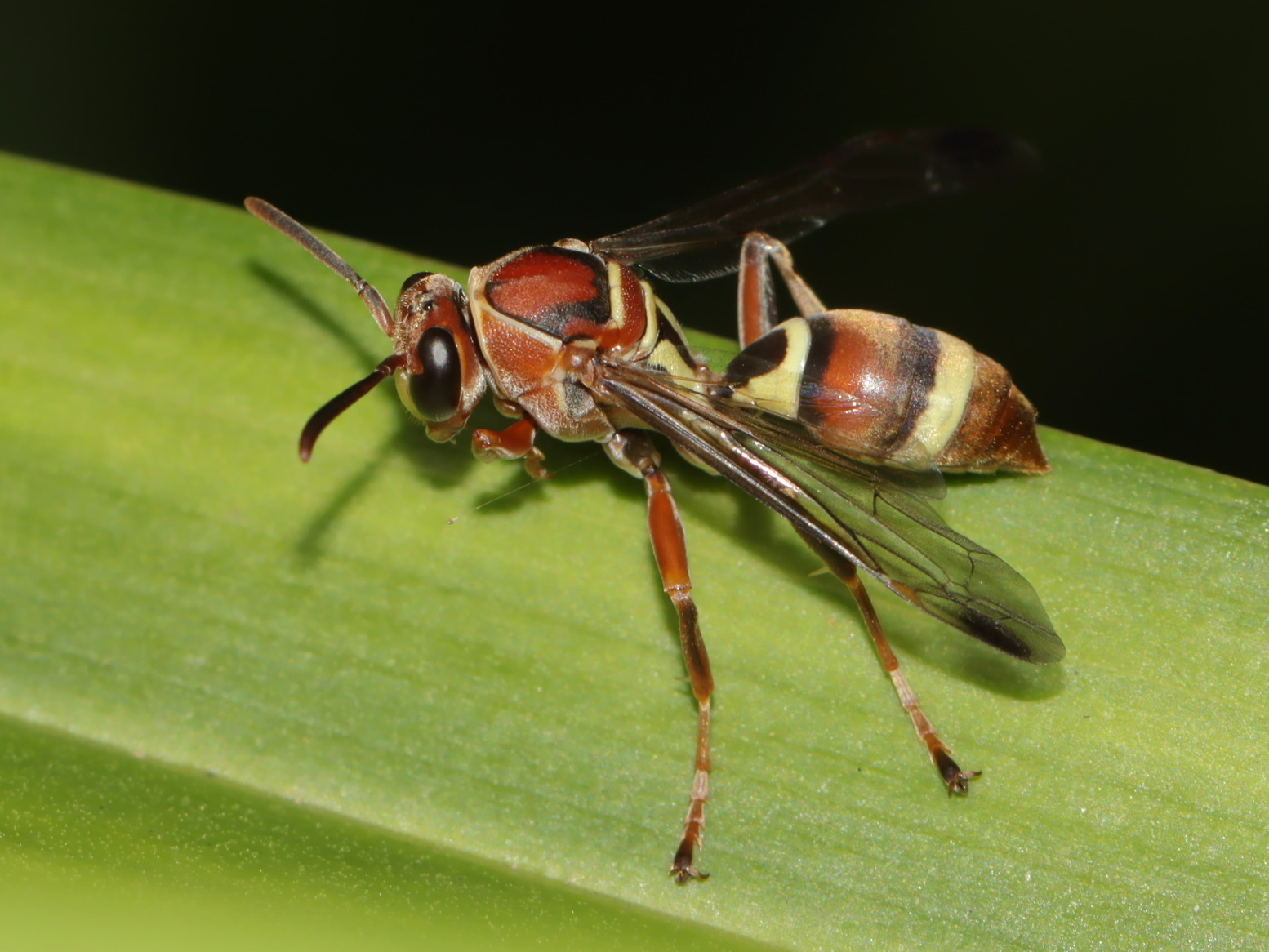
P. s. stigma in Thailand

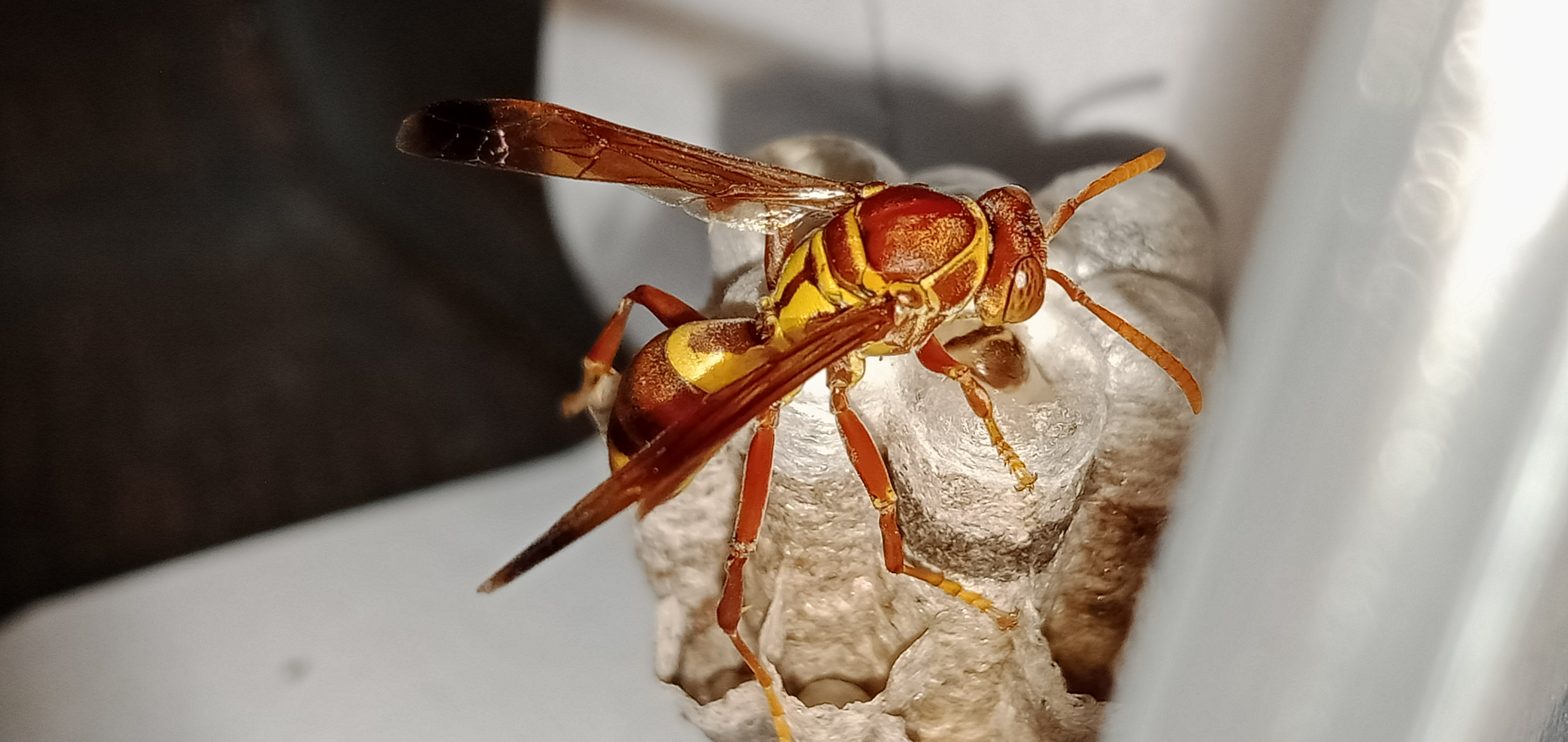
P. s. tamulus foundress in India

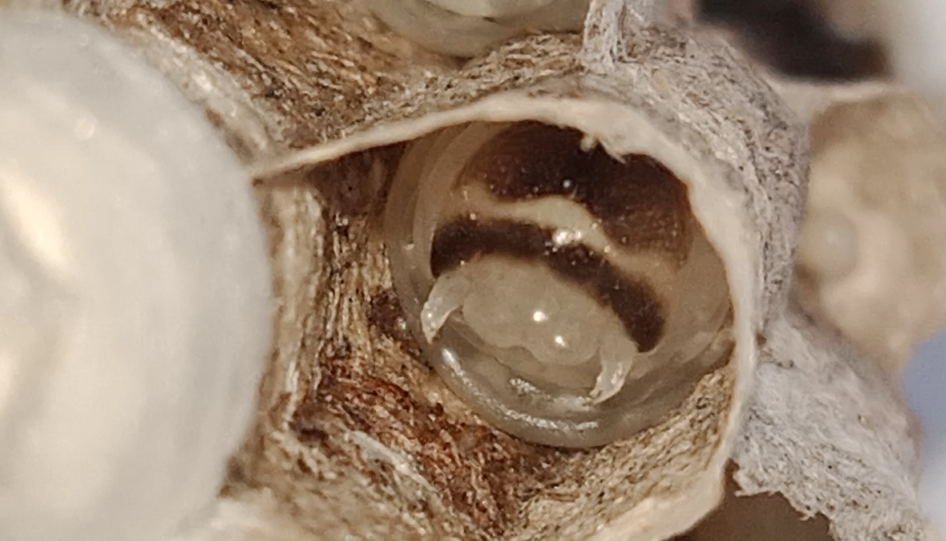
P. s. tamulus larva with jaws open

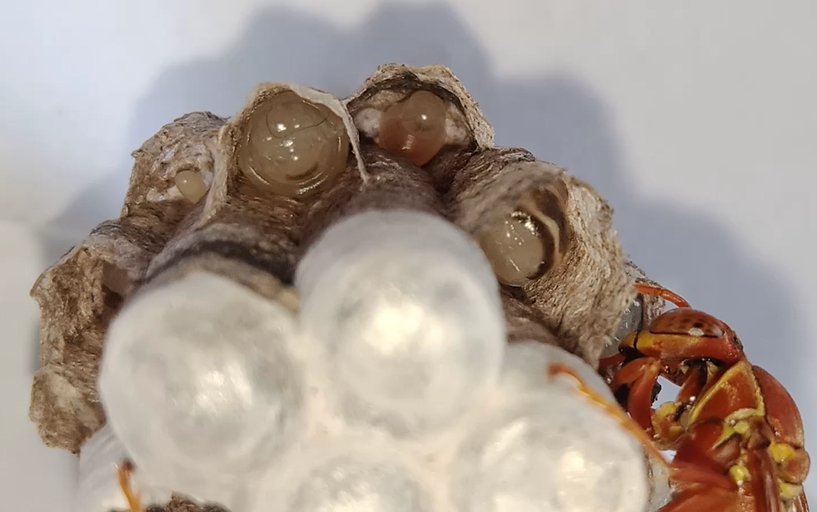
P. s. tamulus egg and larvae

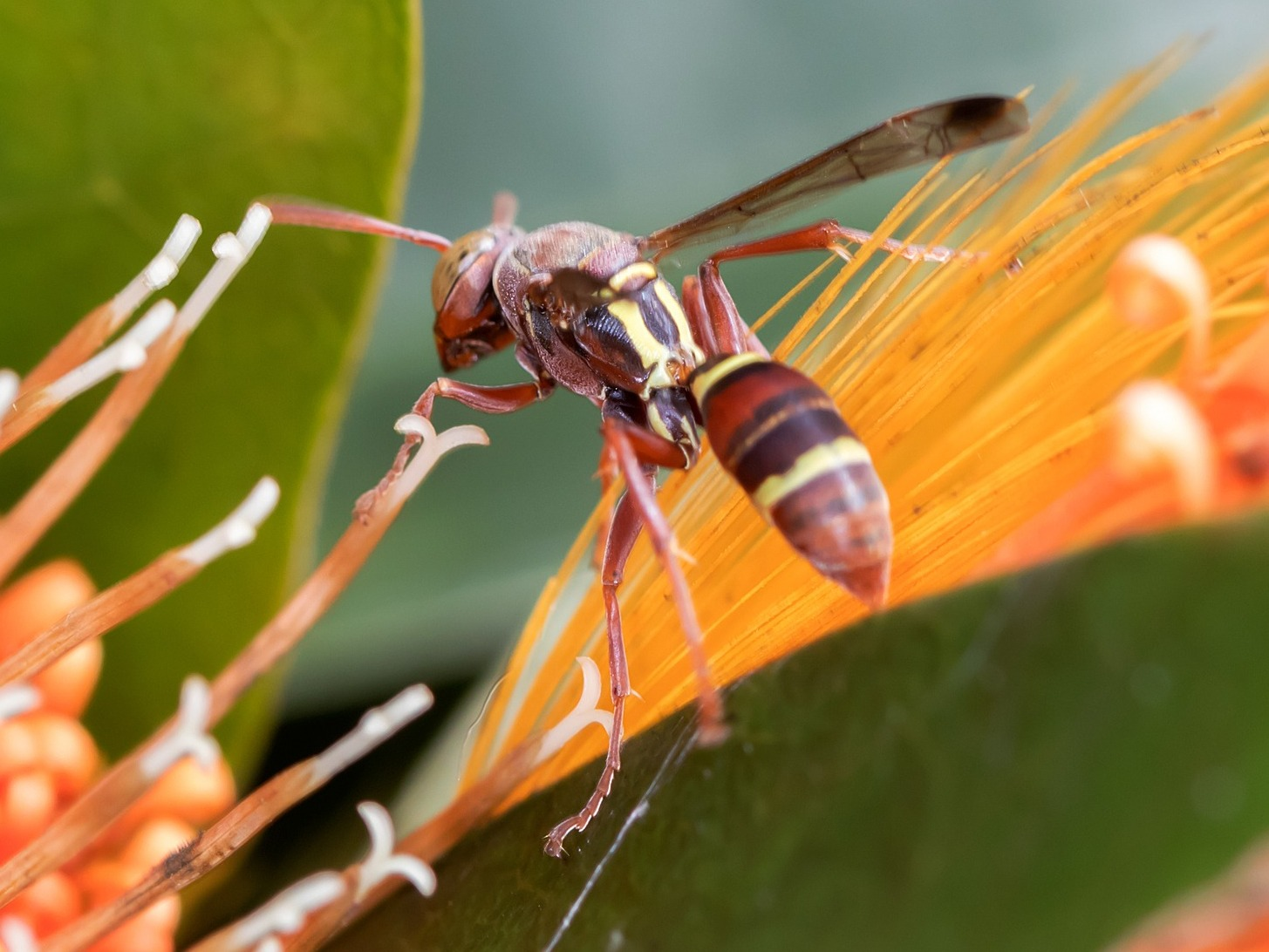
P. s. townsvillensis in Australia
