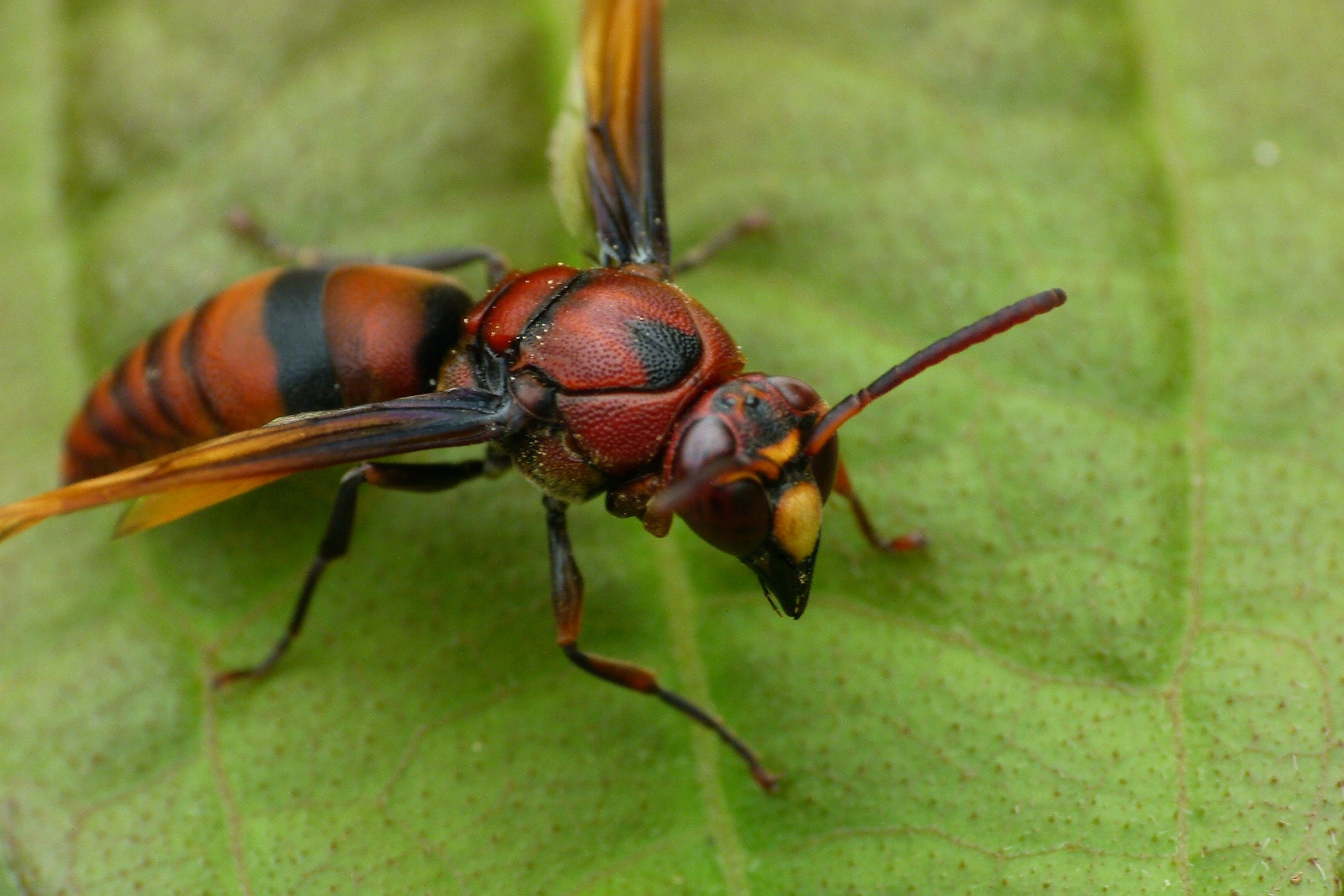
- R. b. brunneum from Karnataka, India
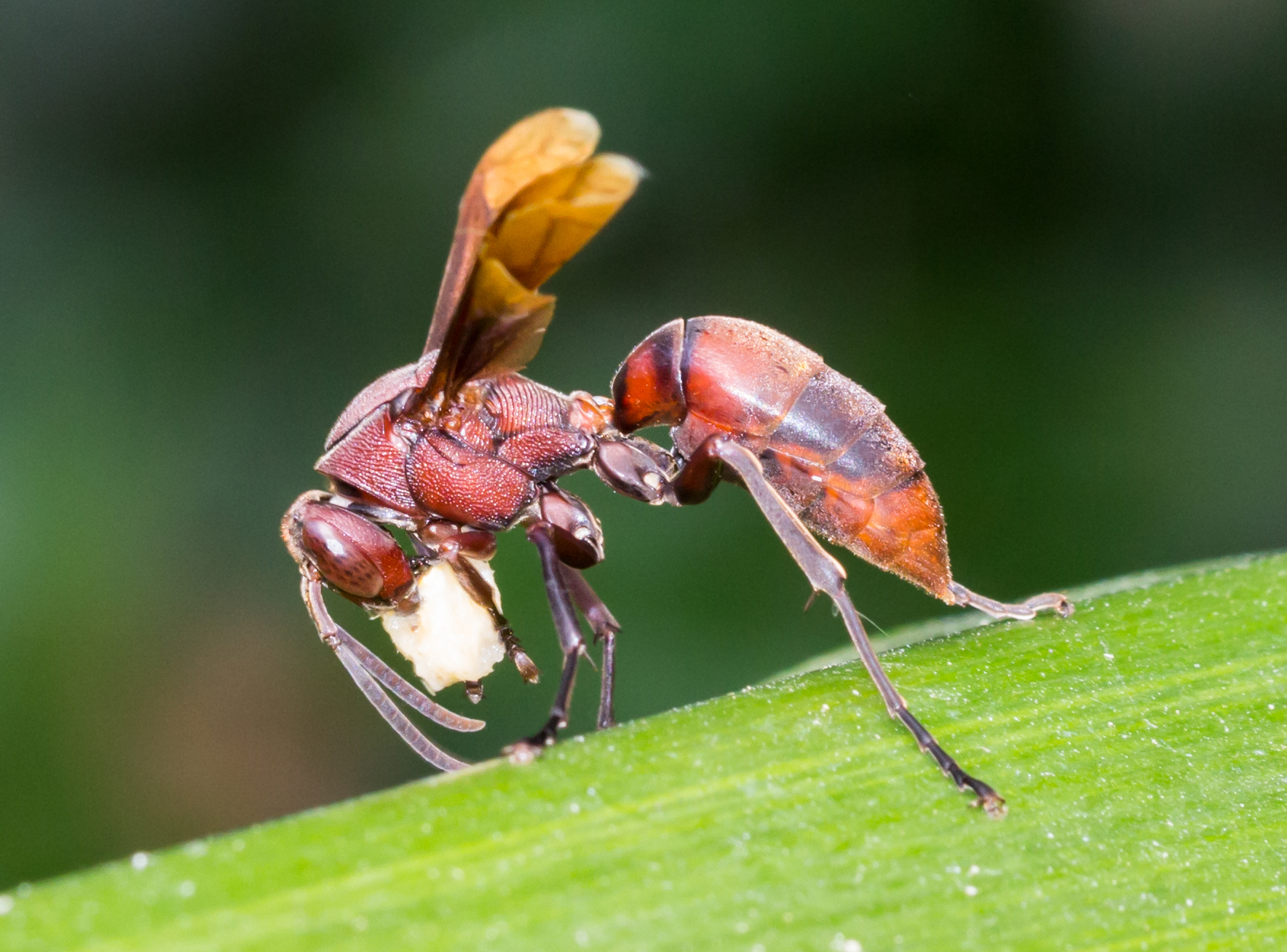
- From Indonesia

Scientific classification
- Kingdom: Animalia
- Phylum: Arthropoda
- Clade: Pancrustacea
- Class: Insecta
- Order: Hymenoptera
- Family: Vespidae
- Genus: Rhynchium
- Species: R. brunneum

Binomial name
- Rhynchium brunneum (Fabricius, 1793)

= Rhynchium brunneum =

Species of wasp

Rhynchium brunneum is a species of potter wasp found in Asia. Across the wide distribution range, they show considerable variation in the patterning and several subspecies have been described, including:

- R. b. brunneum (Fabricius, 1793)
- R. b. ceylonicum Giordani Soika, 1994
- R. b. maladivum Gusenleitner, 2003
