= Jacobus van der Vecht =

Dutch entomologist

- Born: 5 July 1906; The Hague, Netherlands
- Died: 15 March 1992 (aged 85); Putten, Netherlands
- Education: Rijksuniversiteit Leiden
- Scientific career
- Fields: Zoology, Entomology
- Workplaces: Instituut voor Plantenziekten at Buitenzorg (the Institute for Plant Diseases and Pests at Bogor); University of Indonesia; Rijksmuseum van Natuurlijke Historie; Rijksuniversiteit Groningen; Rijksuniversiteit Leiden
- Author abbrev. (zoology): Vecht

Jacobus van der Vecht (5 July 1906 – 15 March 1992), nicknamed Jaap, was a Dutch entomologist who specialised in Hymenoptera, especially those of the East Indies and New Guinea.

== Early life ==
Van der Vecht was born in The Hague on 5 July 1906. His father, the Master of the Wine Cellars at the court of the then Queen Dowager of the Netherlands, Emma of Waldeck and Pyrmont, had an interest in natural history and reared butterflies as a hobby. He enjoyed taking his sons on walks to study nature and this encouraged a passion for biology in Jacobus.

Van der Vecht left school in The Hague and enrolled to study biology at the Rijksuniversiteit Leiden. Here he began to study the Aculeate Hymenoptera especially the taxonomy of bees, concentrating on the large mining bee genus Andrena and the wasps in the family Sphecidae. He graduated with a master's degree in 1928.

== Career ==
After graduating Van der Vecht took a position in the Dutch East Indies at the Instituut voor Plantenziekten at Buitenzorg (the Institute for Plant Diseases and Pests at Bogor) in Java. While he was in Bogor he continued his work on Hymenoptera in his spare time, although he had other competing interests. For example, he lost most of the function of one eye when he was hit by a tennis ball. During this time he published work on the Indo-Australian Hymenopteran fauna including publications on Trigonalidae, Vespidae, Sphecidae, Apidae, Sapygidae and Pompilidae. At the same time he was undertaking studies on economically important species of animals, mainly pests and their parasites. One important field of his professional research was the fluctuations in pest populations and this resulted in his thesis on a bug which is a pest of the pepper plant, Dasynus piperis which resulted in his being awarded a PhD from the University of Leiden. Another research project undertaken by him involved the rearing of 40 successive generations of the coconut leafmoth Artona catoxantha so that he could study its population dynamics, habits and the effect of parasites and hyperparasites. The results were to be published in 1941, but the proofs and illustrations were lost during the Japanese invasion of the Dutch East Indies. However, a copy of the manuscript was found and published in 1950, after new illustrations had been prepared. Yet another research interest was the influence of climate on pests, publishing an important paper in collaboration with F. H. Schmidt on the fluctuation of the east monsoon in Java and Madura. When the war ended he studied the disease of rice, known as mentek in Indonesia, but he failed to establish the cause of the disease.

Later Van der Vecht grew interested in the biogeography of the Indo-Malaysian area which became an important area of research for him. He began his research in this subject resulted in a paper on the carpenter bees (Xylocopa) of Celebes, a paper which is still important to workers trying to understand the diversity of the carpenter-bees on Sulawesi. Another important paper is on the evolution of some Indo-Australian Eumenes wasps. He observed distinctive differences between the more uniform colour pattern shown by vespid wasps on the large islands in the region and the highly variable patterns of the same species on the small, outer islands of the archipelago. This led to an interest in the evolutionary importance of nest structure in the wasps in the family Vespidae. In addition, he discovered "Van der Vecht's gland", which is an organ which produces a secretion which some groups of vespids use to protect their nests from ants.

Following the Japanese occupation of Indonesia Van der Vecht was detained in prison camps in the harsh circumstances which these camps are notorious for. He was taken from Java to Burma where he worked as a slave labourer on the infamous Burma Railway. The harsh treatment he received during this time affected him for most of his life. After he was liberated he stayed for a while in Singapore at the Raffles Museum before he returned to Java where he was reunited with his wife, Elizabeth M. "Bep" Bourguignon, who he had been separated from for three and a half years as she was detained in separate camps. A colleague, Dr M.A. Lieftinck was allowed to continue to work at the Museum in Bogor during the first year of the occupation. Lieftinck had stored Van der Vecht's collection and library in the museum which meant that both survived the war in good condition. In January 1946 he went home to The Netherlands to recover from his wartime experiences and he also spent three months in the USA, so that he could study the latest developments of agricultural entomology.

In 1947 he returned to Java to take up the position of head of the Institute for Plant Diseases and Pests at Bogor and here he cared for the important collection of insects. He returned to The Netherlands in 1951 but he was appointed professor of entomology and nematology in the Faculty of Agriculture of the University of Indonesia at Bogor in 1952. Van der Vecht directed most of his attention to entomology during his tenure at the University of Indonesia. With Lieftinck he tried to sustain the Entomological Society of Indonesia which was problematic as there were few full-time entomologists who remained in Indonesia after the independence from The Netherlands.

Van der Vecht left Indonesia to return to The Netherlands in 1955 as working in Indonesia became difficult, this time the move was permanent. He took up the position of curator of Hymenoptera at the Rijksmuseum van Natuurlijke Historie in Leiden. He was appointed professor "extraordinaris" for zoological taxonomy at the Rijksuniversiteit Groningen in 1962, and then in 1964 he succeeded Hilbrand Boschma as professor of systematic zoology at the Rijksuniversiteit Leiden, which meant that he had to resign from his post at the Rijksmuseum van Natuurlijke Historie. In 1963 he was chosen a member of the Royal Netherlands Academy of Arts and Sciences, but he was forced to retire for health reasons only five years later.

During the latter part of his career Van der Vecht had an important role in the study of Hymenoptera and as a teacher of taxonomy. Together with Charles Ferriere he revived the pre-war Hymenopterorum Catalogus, a work which is still in progress. He was an early advocate of the importance of phylogenetics for taxonomy. He was president of the Netherlands Entomological Society between 1961 and 1968. He travelled on collecting trips, often with his wife, to destinations such as Suriname, Papua New Guinea and Argentina where he collected Hymenoptera specimens as well as meeting friends and colleagues in the field of Aculeate Hymenoptera. During his life he was an enthusiastic collector of Hymenoptera and during his retirement he continued, especially collecting specimens of parasitic Hymenoptera around the village of Putten, where he and Bep had made their home in a bungalow named Andrena after the bees which he started to study at the beginning of his career, and its surroundings. He was energetic in helping to improve the collection of Hymenoptera in the Rijksmuseum van Natuurlijke Historie at Leiden as well as continuing to publish papers into his eighties. In retirement Van der Vecht and his wife struggled with bouts of mental illness. His wife died in 1986 and their only child had died as an infant before the war; the couple were unable to have any more children after their experiences in the Japanese prison camps during the war.

== Species named in honour of Van der Vecht ==
A number of species have been named in honour of Van der Vecht by other entomologists, mainly Hymenoptera, and examples these include the ichneumonid Aulosaphes vechti, the eusocial hover wasp Liostenogaster vechti, the small carpenter bee Ceratina vechti, the "tarantula hawk" Hemipepsis vechti, as well as the potter wasps Epsilon vechti and Labus vandervechti.

== Publications ==
Van der Vecht was a prolific author of papers and a full bibliography is set out in his obituary by C. van Achterberg which was published in Zoologische Mededelingen in 1992. A selection of some of the more notable are set out below:

- 1926 Nieuwe naamlijst van de in Nederland voorkomende soorten van het geslacht Andrena. (Hymenoptera, Apidae). Zool. Med. Leiden 9:300–304.
- 1930. with S. Leefmans De roodgeringde mangga-rups, Noorda albizonalis Hamps. Korte Meded. Inst. Plantenz. Buitenzorg 14:1–8.
- 1931 De stand van het onderzoek der peper-insecten in Nederlandsch Indie. Landbouw 6:820–828.
- 1933 De groote peperwants of semoenjoeng, Dasynus piperis China Dissertation Rijksuniversiteit Leiden: 1–101.
- 1936 Some notes on the life-history of Apoderus clavatus Pasc. (Col., Curculionidae). Ent. Meded. Ned.-Indie 2:9–12.
- 1947 [The study of the insect fauna of the East Indian Archipelago]. Verslag 101 ste Zomerverg. Ned. ent. Ver.: x–xiii. Reprinted in Tijdschr. Ent. 89 (1948): xlii–xlv.
- 1948 Entomologie in de U.S.A.— Verslag 79de Winterverg. Ned. ent. Ver.: xiii–xv. Reprinted in Tijdschr. Ent. 90 (1949): xiii–xv.
- 1950 Population studies on the Coconut Leaf Moth Artona catoxantha Hamps. (Lep., Zyg.). Proc. 8th int. Congr. Entomology: 702–715.
- 1952 (with F.H. Schmidt). East monsoon fluctuations in Java and Madura during the period 1880–1940. Verh. Metereol. Magn. Inst. Djakarta 43:1–36.
- 1953 The Xylocopa species of Celebes. Idea 9:57–69
- 1953 The problem of the mentek disease of rice in Java. Contr. gen. agric. Res. Stn Bogor 137:1–88.
- 1954 Agricultural Entomology in Indonesia, 1939–1948. Proc. 7th Pac. Sc. Congr. 4:100–108
- 1972 Palaearctic Eumenidae Hymenopterorum catalogus Volume 8 of Hymenopterorum catalogus. Nova editio Dr. W. Junk, 199pp
- 1990. (with J.M. Carpenter). A catalogue of the genera of the Vespidae (Hymenoptera). Zool. Verh. Leiden 260:1–62.
- 1991 (with J.M. Carpenter). A study of the Vespidae described by William J. Fox (Insecta: Hymenoptera), with assessment of taxonomic implications. Ann. Carnegie Mus. 60:211-24.
