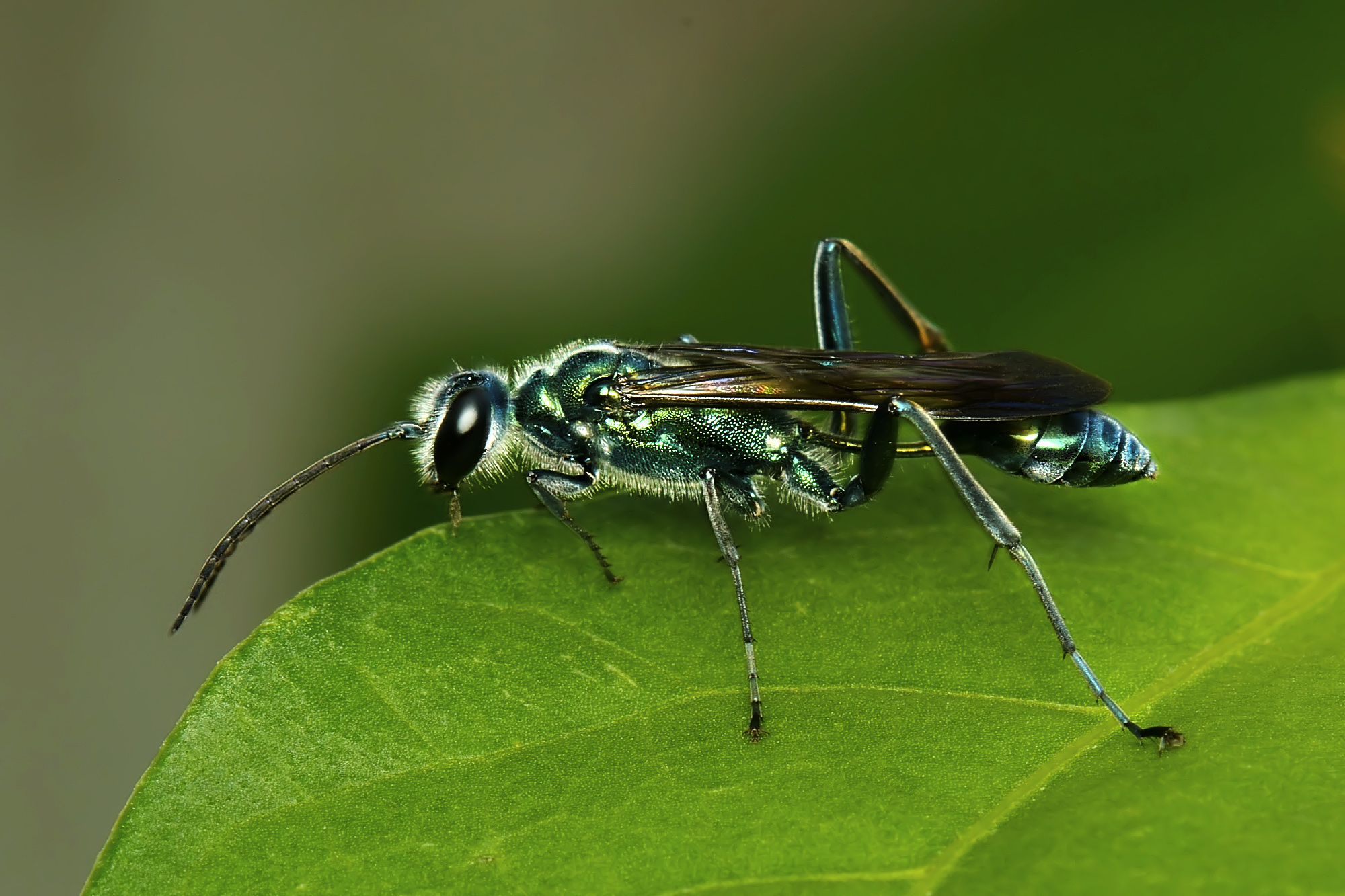

Scientific classification
- Kingdom: Animalia
- Phylum: Arthropoda
- Clade: Pancrustacea
- Class: Insecta
- Order: Hymenoptera
- Family: Sphecidae
- Tribe: Sceliphrini
- Genus: Chalybion
- Species: C. bengalense

Binomial name
- Chalybion bengalense Dahlbom, 1845

= Chalybion bengalense =

Species of wasp

Chalybion bengalense, also known as the oriental mud-dauber wasp, is a widely distributed member of the Chalybion genus. Melittobia assemi has been reported as a parasite of this species.

== Description ==
Chalybion bengalense are metallic blue with semi-transparent brownish wings and small white hairs. Females range from 13–17 mm (0.51–0.67 in) in length, while males range from 8.5–15 mm (0.33–0.59 in).

== Distribution ==
This species is native to the indomalayan realm as well as Australia and New Guinea. It has been introduced in East Africa, Italy and Greece.

== Nesting ==
Rather than building new nests they use preexisting holes such as man-made holes or old nests made by Sceliphron and various eumenids. Females paralyze spiders and place them into cells, with between 8 and 60 spiders per cell. She then lays an egg on one of the spiders before sealing off the cell with mud. This process is repeated with multiples cells before the entire nest is sealed off with an extra layer made of lime, mud, cow dung, resinous material, or rotting plant matter.
