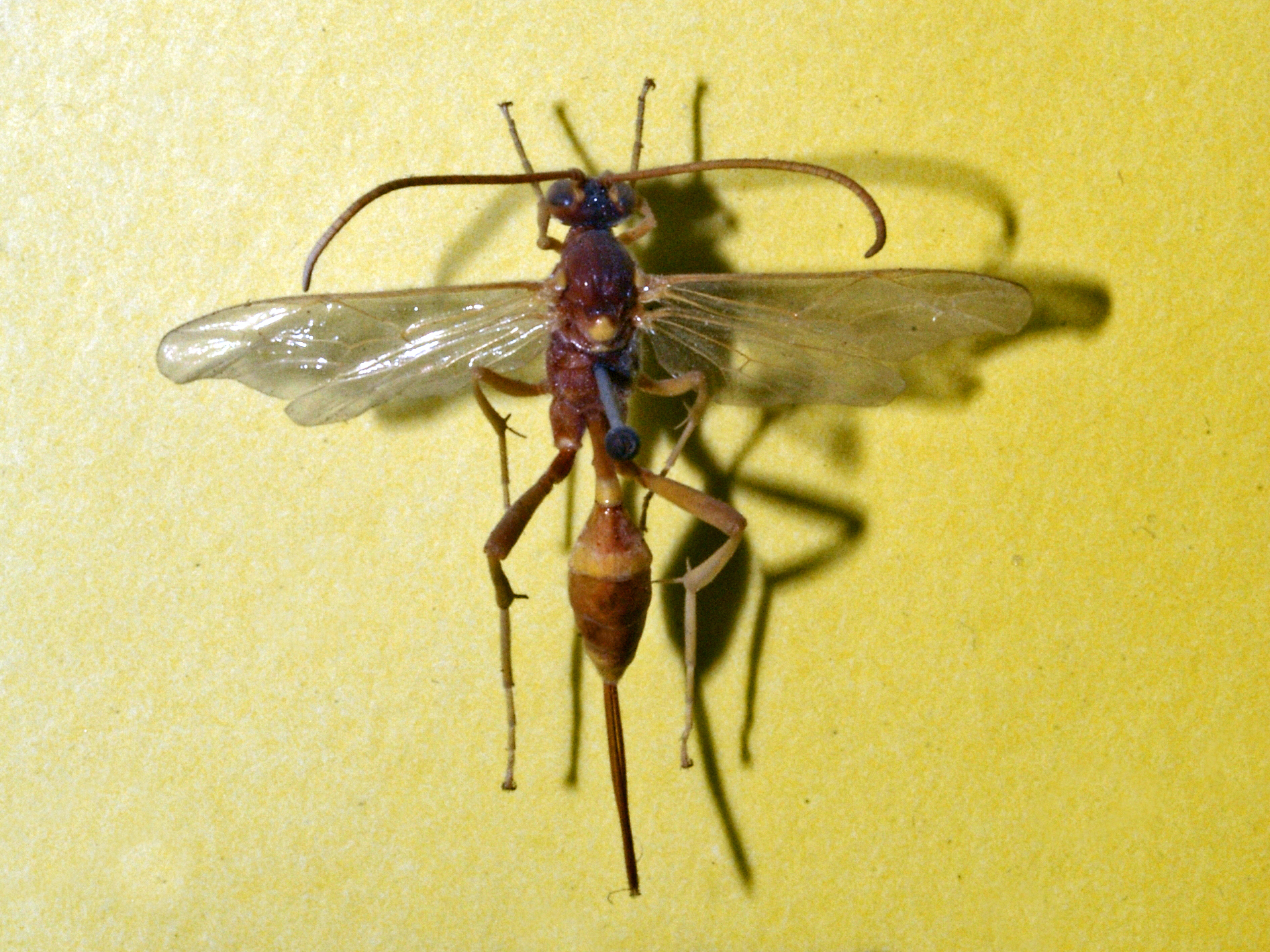
- Acroricnus seductor. Museum specimen

Scientific classification
- Kingdom: Animalia
- Phylum: Arthropoda
- Class: Insecta
- Order: Hymenoptera
- Family: Ichneumonidae
- Genus: Acroricnus
- Species: A. seductor

Binomial name
- Acroricnus seductor (Scopoli, 1786)

Synonyms
- Acroricnus ruficornis (Forster, 1855); Acroricnus seductorius (Fabricius, 1793)

= Acroricnus seductor =

Species of wasp

Acroricnus seductor is a species of wasp belonging to the family Ichneumonidae.

== Subspecies ==
Subspecies of A. seductor include:

- Acroricnus seductor elegans (Mocsáry, 1883)
- Acroricnus seductor seductor (Scopoli], 1786)
- Acroricnus seductor syriacus (Mocsáry, 1883)

== Biology ==
These ichneumonid wasps parasitize larvae of Sceliphron spirifex, Sceliphron destillatorium and Sceliphron caementarium. Females of this species deposit eggs inserting the ovipositor through the mud wall of their host nest.

== Distribution ==
This species is present in Europe, in the Near East, in North Africa and in the Oriental ecozone.
