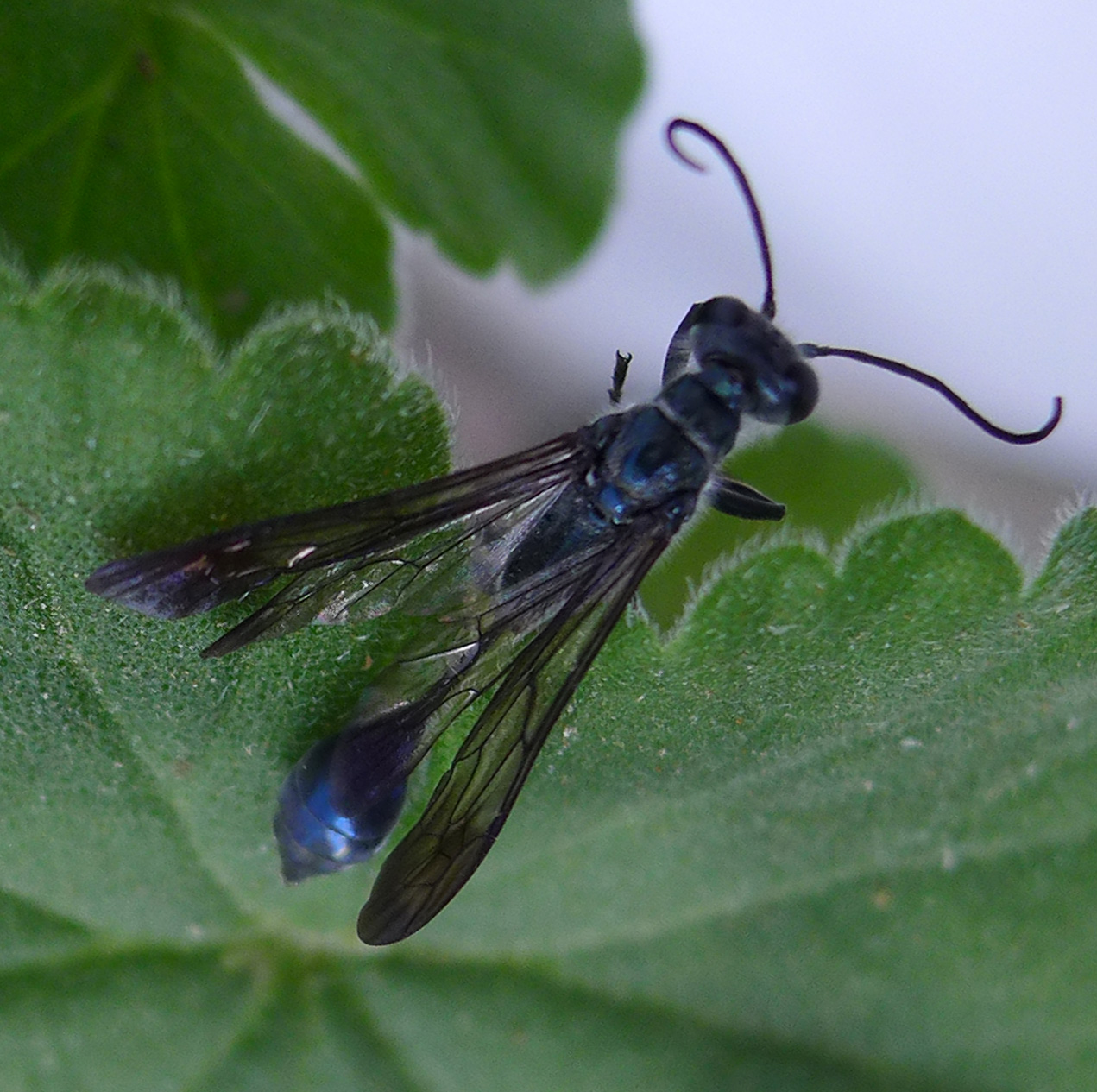
- Chalybion flebile in Spain.

Scientific classification
- Kingdom: Animalia
- Phylum: Arthropoda
- Clade: Pancrustacea
- Class: Insecta
- Order: Hymenoptera
- Family: Sphecidae
- Tribe: Sceliphrini
- Genus: Chalybion
- Species: C. flebile

Binomial name
- Chalybion flebile (Lepeletier, 1845)

Synonyms
- Pelopoeus flebilis Lepeletier, 1845; Pelopoeus targionii Carruccio, 1872; Sceliphron (Chalybion) targionii Honoré, 1942

= Chalybion flebile =

Species of wasp

Chalybion flebile is a species of mud-dauber wasp belonging to the family Sphecidae.

== Description ==
Chalybion flebile can reach a length of 11–14 millimetres (0.43–0.55 in) in the males, of 11–16 millimetres (0.43–0.63 in) in the females. Head, thorax and abdomen are metallic blue-green. Antennae are black. Forewings are darkened.

== Distribution ==
This species is present in Greece, Italy, Portugal, Spain, North Africa and in the Near East.
