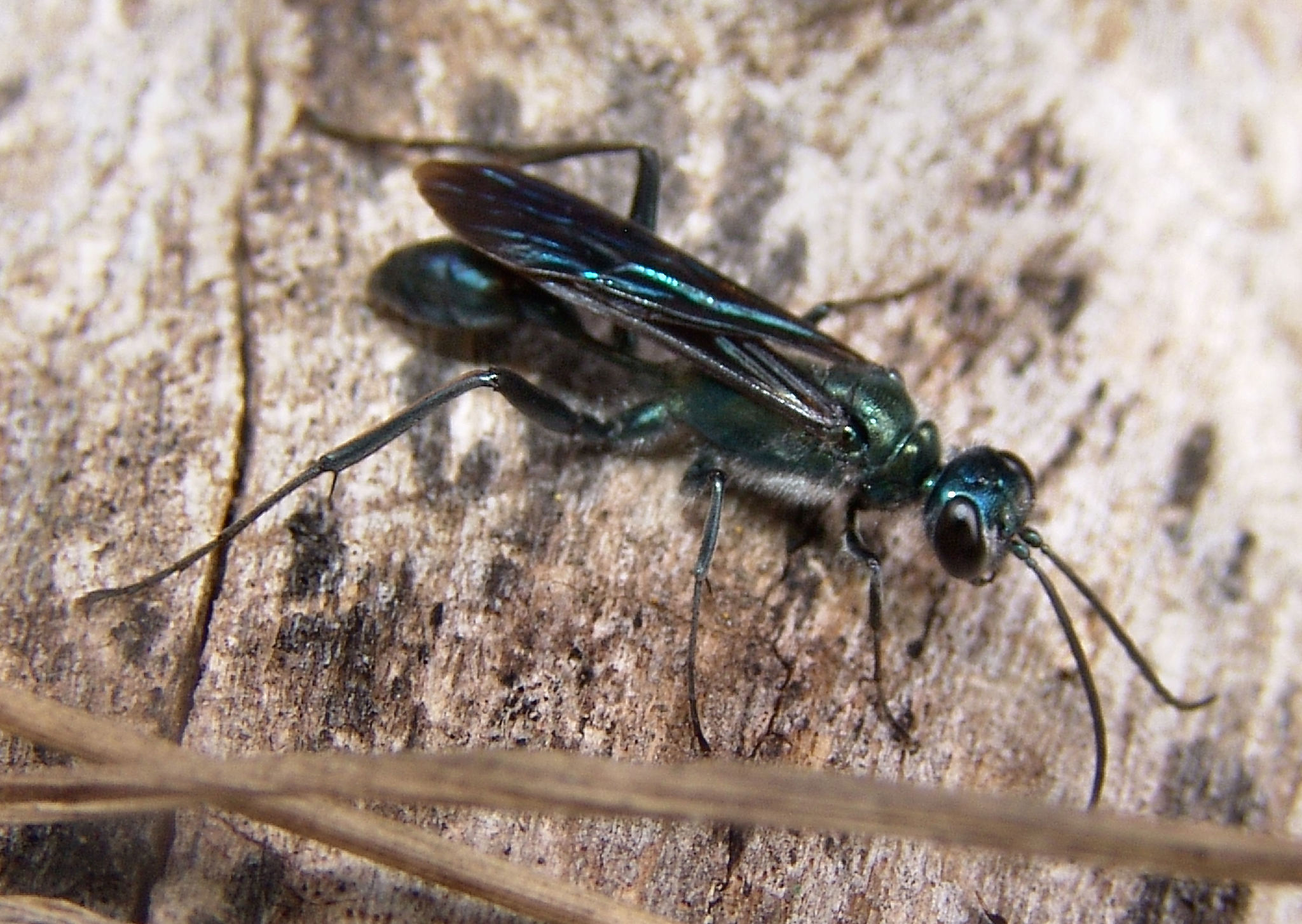
- Chalybion zimmermanni zimmermanni, Arkansas

Scientific classification
- Kingdom: Animalia
- Phylum: Arthropoda
- Clade: Pancrustacea
- Class: Insecta
- Order: Hymenoptera
- Family: Sphecidae
- Tribe: Sceliphrini
- Genus: Chalybion
- Species: C. zimmermanni

Binomial name
- Chalybion zimmermanni Dahlbom, 1843

Synonyms
- Pelopoeus texanus Cresson, 1873; Pelopoeus zimmermanni (Dahlbom, 1843); Sceliphron zimmermanni (Dahlbom, 1843)

= Chalybion zimmermanni =

Species of wasp

Chalybion zimmermanni, or Zimmermann's mud-dauber wasp, is a species of thread-waisted wasp in the family Sphecidae.

== Subspecies ==
There are three subspecies of Chalybion zimmermanni:

- Chalybion zimmermanni aztecum (de Saussure, 1867) (Aztec mud-dauber wasp)
- Chalybion zimmermanni peninsularum Bohart & Menke, 1963
- Chalybion zimmermanni zimmermanni Dahlbom, 1843

== Distribution and habitat ==
C. zimmermanni occurs across North America. The nominate subspecies occurs from the southeastern US to Arizona. The subspecies C. zimmermanni peninsularum is restricted to Baja California, Mexico. The subspecies C. zimmermanni aztecum is the most widespread and occurs from the southern United States south to Nicaragua as well as in the Caribbean.

== Gallery ==
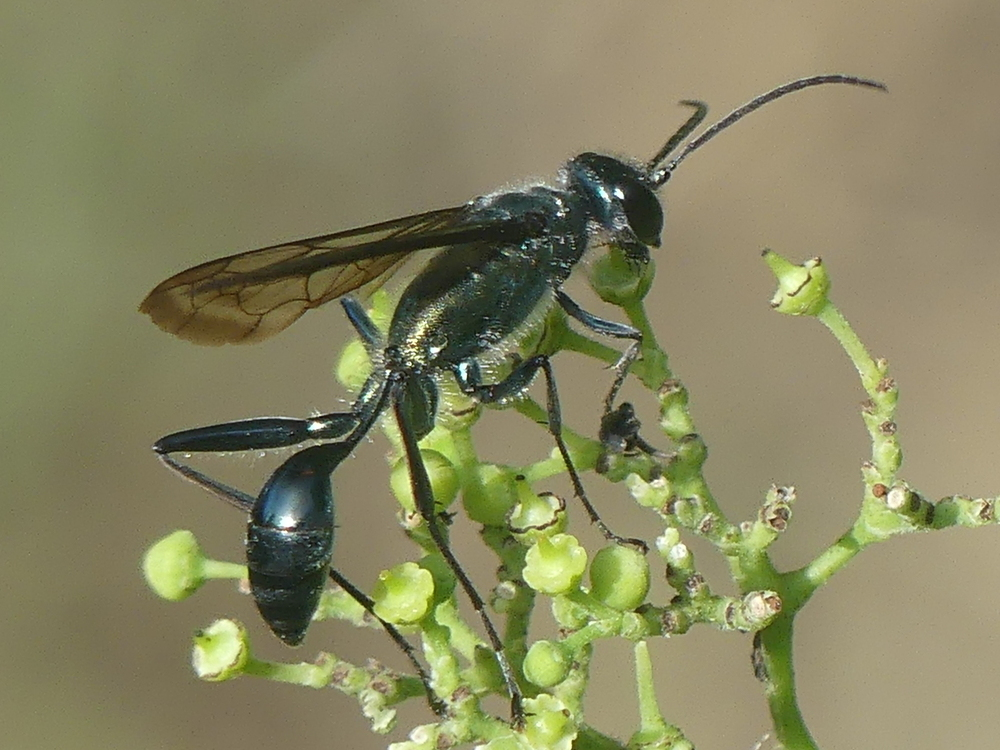
C. (Chalybion) zimmermanni aztecum in Texas.

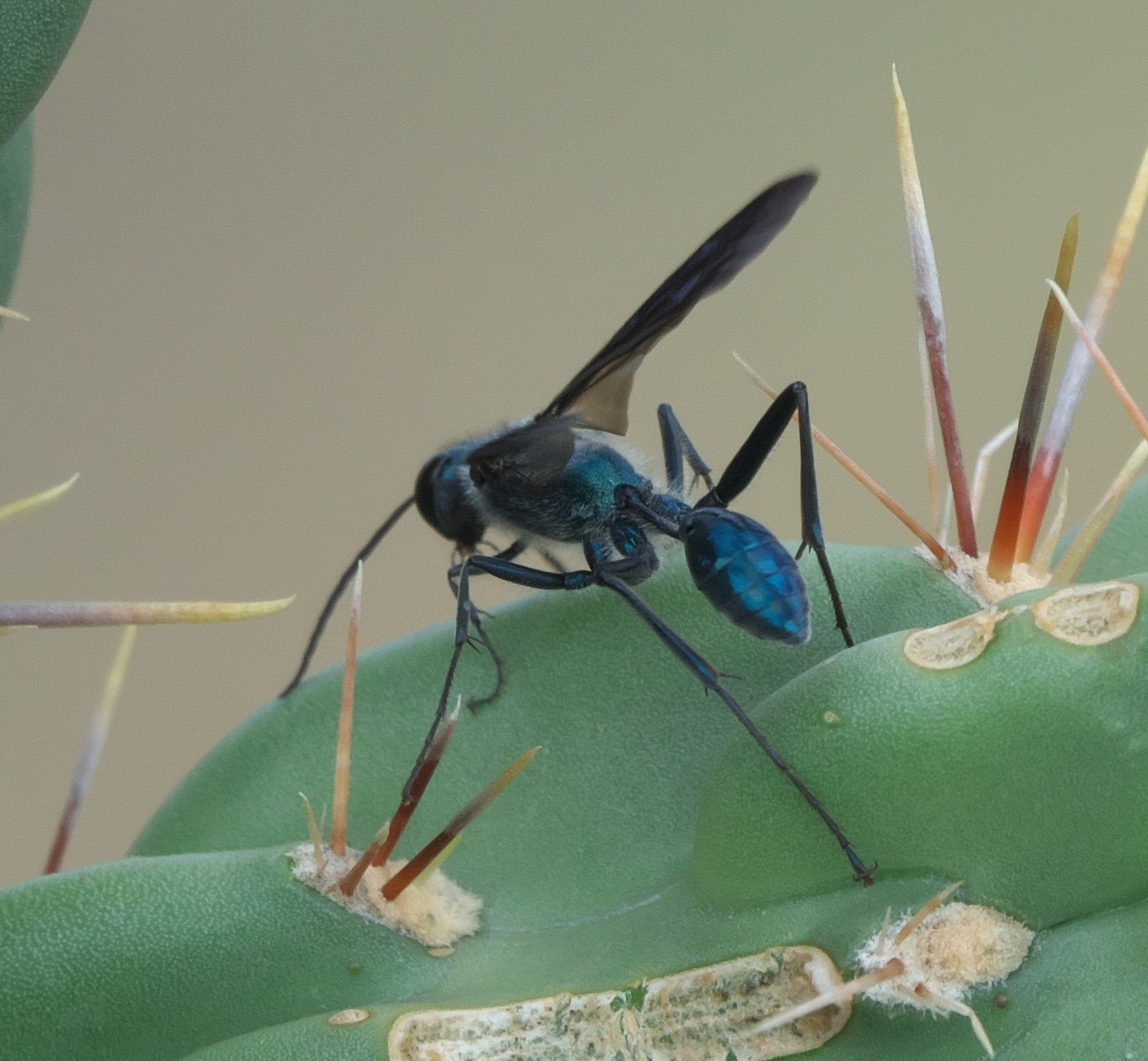
C. (Chalybion) zimmermanni zimmermanni in Oklahoma.
