= Chubutolithes =

Trace fossil classification
- Ichnofamily: †Coprinisphaeridae
- Ichnogenus: †Chubutolithes; Ihering, 1922

Type ichnospecies
- Chubutolithes gaimanensis Bown & Ratcliffe, 1988

Trace fossil

Chubutolithes is an ichnogenus representing the fossil nests of a mud dauber.
