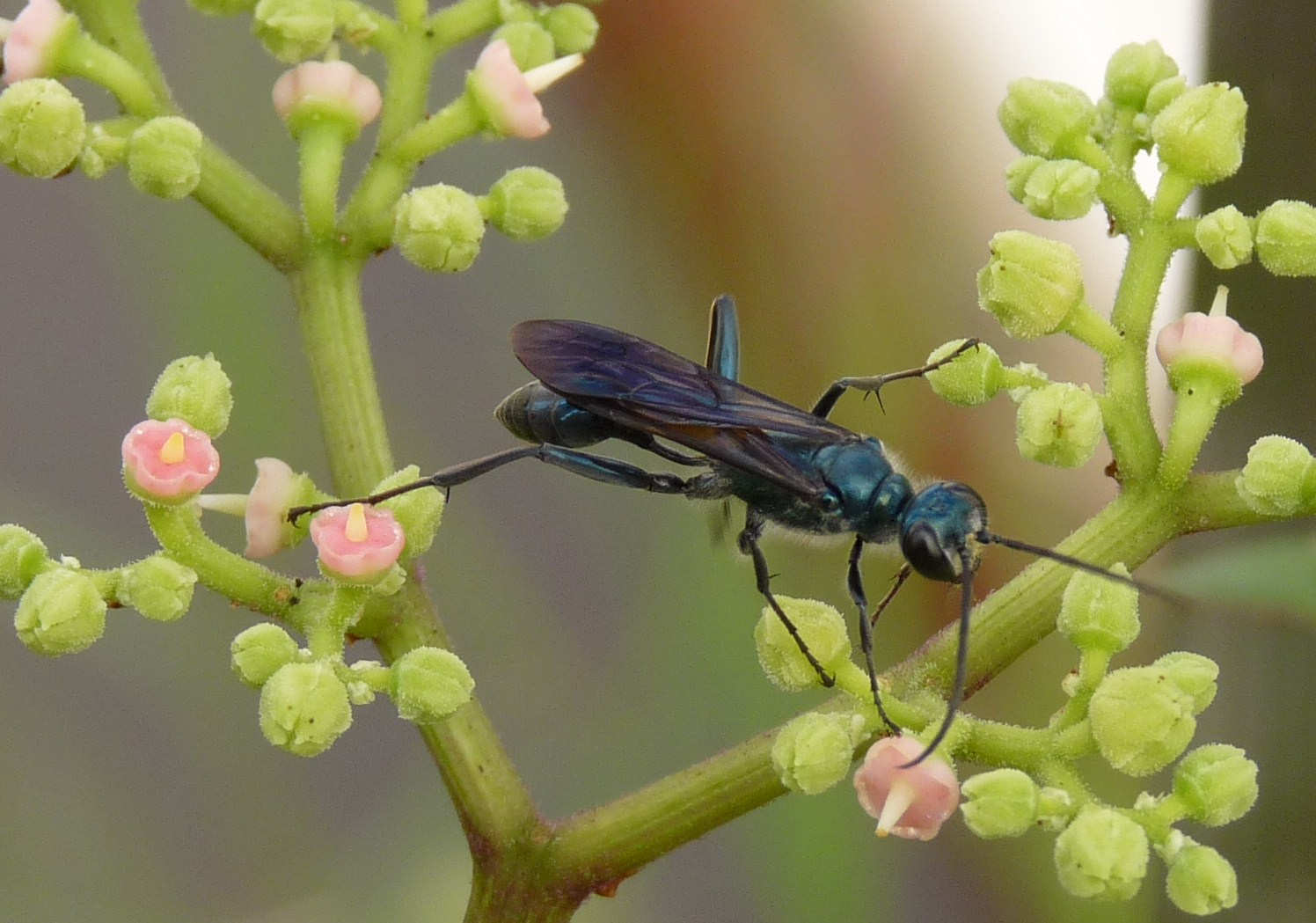
- Chalybion japonicum

Scientific classification
- Kingdom: Animalia
- Phylum: Arthropoda
- Clade: Pancrustacea
- Class: Insecta
- Order: Hymenoptera
- Family: Sphecidae
- Subfamily: Sceliphrinae
- Tribe: Sceliphrini
- Genus: Chalybion; Dahlbom, 1843

Type species
- Chalybion californicum (Saussure, 1867)

Species
- 54 extant + 1 extinct species

Synonyms
- Chalybium Agassiz, 1846

= Chalybion =

Genus of wasps

Chalybion, also known as blue mud-dauber wasps, is a genus of wasp in the family Sphecidae. The species often nest in old, abandoned mud nests of other species and in pre-existing cavities.

== Taxonomy and phylogeny ==
Chalybion was originally described as a genus by Dahlbom in 1843. Kohl demoted Chalybion to a subgenus of Sceliphron in 1918 and established Hemichalybion as a sister subgenus of Sceliphron. Both Chalybion and Hemichalybion were elevated to genus status by Bohart and Menke in 1963. The same authors then demoted Hemichalybion to a subgenus of Chalybion in 1976.

== Distribution and habitat ==
Chalybion species are present in all continents except for Antarctica though are most common in the Nearctic and Paleotropic regions.

== Behavior ==
Females of Chalybion species nest in a wide range of natural or artificial pre-existing cavities, such as holes in stone, wood, in walls, and in plant stems. They also reuse old mud nests of other wasps, including those of Trypoxylon, Sceliphron, Eumeninae, and Ageniellini, or old mud nests of bees.

C. californicum in particular is known for repurposing old nests of Sceliphron caementarium. The females then hunt and paralyze spiders, particularly of the families Araneidae and Theridiidae, which they use as provisions their brood cells.

== Interaction with other species ==
The nests of Chalybion may, themselves, be repurposed by other mud-nesting wasps, such as Eumeninae.

== Species ==
There are 54 described living species of Chalybion:

=== Subgenus Chalybion (Chalybion) Agassiz, 1846 ===
- Chalybion fuscum (Lepeletier, 1845) (Madagascar, Sri Lanka)
- Chalybion ohli Dollfuss, 2016
- Chalybion yangi Li, 1995

==== Chalybion bengalense species-group ====
- Chalybion bengalense (Dahlbom, 1845) (Hawaii, Mauritius, Mozambique, Seychelles, Socotra, South Africa; introduced in Italy)
- Chalybion clarebaltazarae Abenis & Lit, 2020
- Chalybion flebile (Lepeletier de Saint Fargeau, 1845)
- Chalybion japonicum (Gribodo, 1880) (China, Japan, Ryukyu Islands, South Korea, Tanzania, Thailand)
- Chalybion klapperichi (Balthasar, 1957)
- Chalybion minos (de Beaumont, 1965)
- Chalybion omissum (Kohl, 1889)
- Chalybion petroleum Hensen, 1988
- Chalybion saudiarabicum Schmid-Egger, 2025
- Chalybion stephenreyesi Abenis & Lit, 2020
- Chalybion turanicum (Gussakovskij, 1935)
- Chalybion vechti Hensen, 1988
- Chalybion walteri (Kohl, 1889)
- Chalybion zimmermanni Dahlbom, 1843 (North America)
  - Chalybion zimmermanni zimmermanni Dahlbom, 1843
  - Chalybion zimmermanni aztecum (de Saussure, 1867)
  - Chalybion zimmermanni peninsulare R. Bohart and Menke, 1963

==== Chalybion californicum species-group ====
- Chalybion californicum (de Saussure, 1867) (North America; introduced in Croatia)

==== Chalybion fabricator species-group ====
- Chalybion accline (Kohl, 1918)
- Chalybion fabricator (F. Smith, 1860)
- Chalybion hainanense Terayama & Tano, 2018
- Chalybion lividum Hensen, 1988
- Chalybion magnum Hensen, 1988
- Chalybion malignum (Kohl, 1906)
- Chalybion sulawesii Ohl & Höhn, 2011
- Chalybion tanvinhense Pham, Ohl, & Truong, 2019

==== Chalybion gredleri species-group ====
- Chalybion gredleri (Kohl, 1918) (Democratic Republic of Congo)
- Chalybion triangulum Hensen, 1988 (Central African Republic, Gambia, Togo)

==== Chalybion incisum species-group ====
- Chalybion incisum Hensen, 1988

==== Chalybion madecassum species-group ====
- Chalybion bonneti Leclercq, 1966 (Madagascar)
- Chalybion dolichothorax (Kohl, 1918)
- Chalybion frontale (Kohl, 1906)
- Chalybion gracile Hensen, 1988
- Chalybion iridescens Pham & Ohl, 2025
- Chalybion madecassum (Gribodo, 1883) (Madagascar, Seychelles Islands)
- Chalybion polyphemus Hensen, 1988

==== Chalybion tibiale species-group ====
- Chalybion ammophiloides Hensen, 1988
- Chalybion bocandei (Spinola, 1851)
  - Chalybion bocandei bocandei (Spinola, 1851) (Ghana, Guinea, Liberia, Sierre Leone)
  - Chalybion bocandei aeronitens Hensen, 1988 (Central African Republic, Democratic Republic of Congo)
- Chalybion heinii (Kohl, 1906)
- Chalybion henseni Schmid-Egger, 2025
- Chalybion kenyae Hensen, 1988 (Kenya)
- Chalybion laevigatum (Kohl, 1888) (Botswana, Ethiopia, Mozambique, Namibia, South Africa, Tanzania, Zanzibar)
- Chalybion mochii Hensen, 1988 (Kenya)
- Chalybion parvulum Hensen, 1988 (Kenya)
- Chalybion planatum (Arnold, 1951) (Ethiopia)
- Chalybion ruficorne Hensen, 1988 (Central African Republic)
- Chalybion schulthessirechbergi (Kohl, 1918) (Democratic Republic of Congo)
- Chalybion sommereni (R.Turner, 1920) (Angola, Kenya, Tanzania, Democratic Republic of Congo)
- Chalybion tibiale (Fabricius, 1781) (South Africa)
- Chalybion tomentosum Hensen, 1988

=== Subgenus Chalybion (Hemichalybion) Kohl, 1918 ===
==== Chalybion spinolae species-group ====
- Chalybion clypeatum (Fairmaire, 1858) (Angola, Cameroon, Ethiopia, Gabon, Mozambique, Tanzania, Democratic Republic of Congo)
  - Chalybion clypeatum clypeatum (Fairmaire, 1858)
  - Chalybion clypeatum lusingi (Leclercq, 1955) (Democratic Republic of Congo)
  - Chalybion clypeatum kiloensis (Leclercq, 1955) (Democratic Republic of Congo)
- Chalybion spinolae (Lepeletier de Saint Fargeau, 1845)
  - Chalybion spinolae spinolae (Lepeletier, 1845) (Ethiopia, South Africa, Tanzania, Democratic Republic of Congo)
  - Chalybion spinolae rufopictum (Magretti, 1884) (Eritrea, Ethiopia, Mali)
  - Chalybion spinolae saussurei (Kohl, 1918) (South Africa)
- Chalybion sumatranum (Kohl, 1884)

==== Chalybion femoratum species-group ====
- Chalybion femoratum (Fabricius, 1781)

== Extinct species ==
There is one described fossil species of Chalybion:

- Chalybion mortuum Cockerell, 1907

== See also ==
- Black-and-yellow mud-dauber wasps (Sceliphron)
- Organ pipe mud dauber (Trypoxylon politum)

== Gallery ==
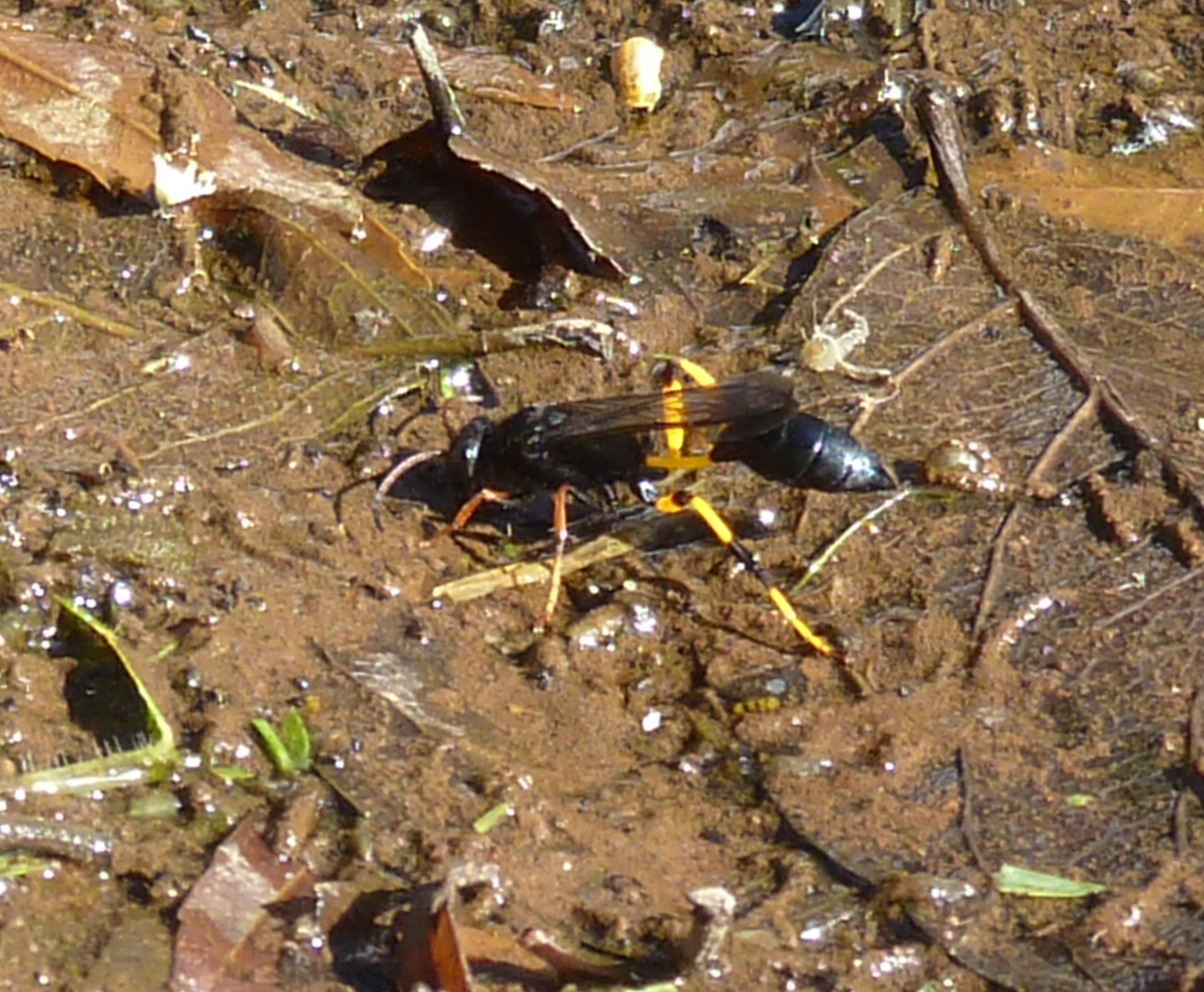
C. (Hemichalybion) spinolae in South Africa.

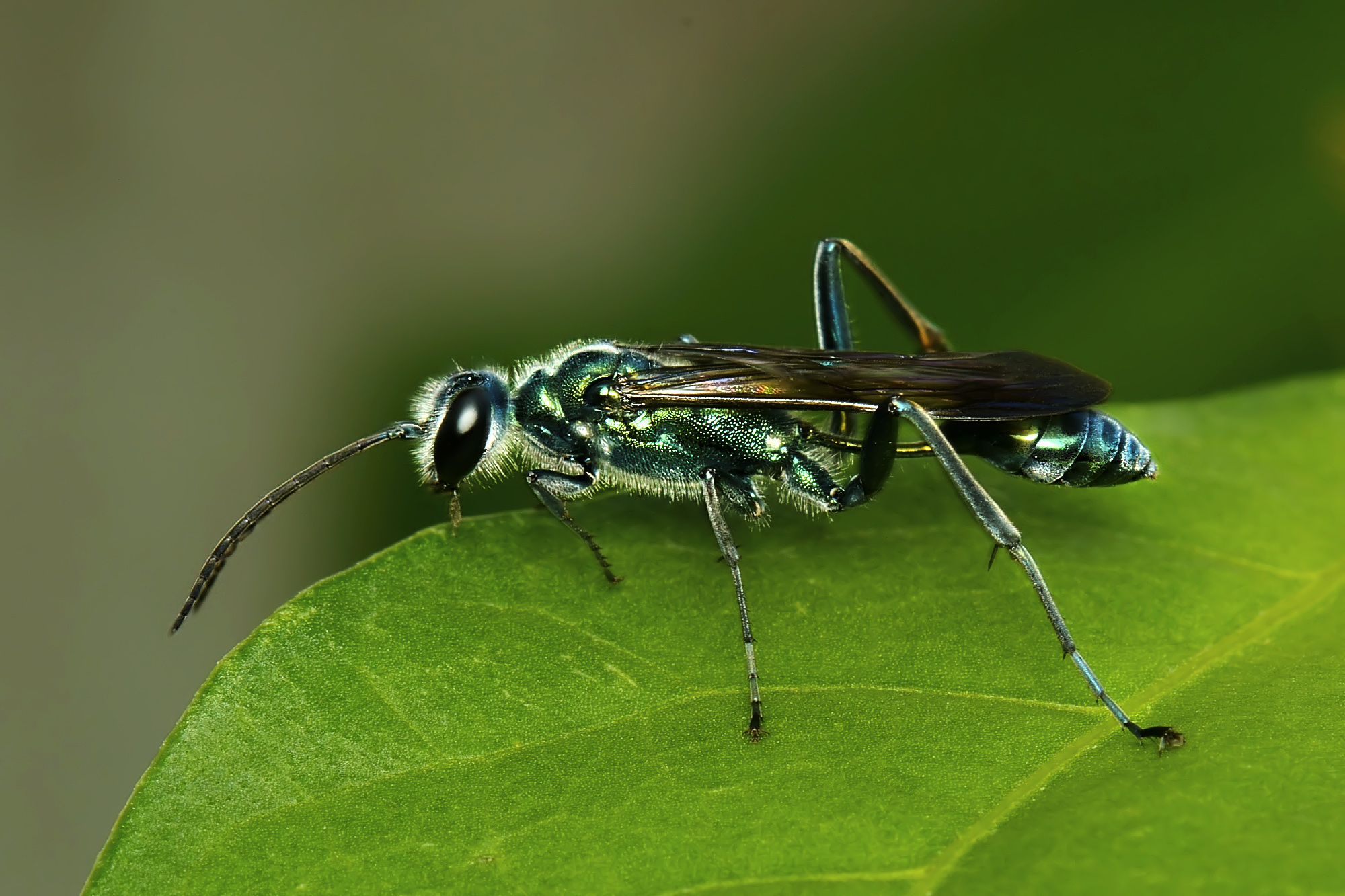
C. (Chalybion) bengalense in India.

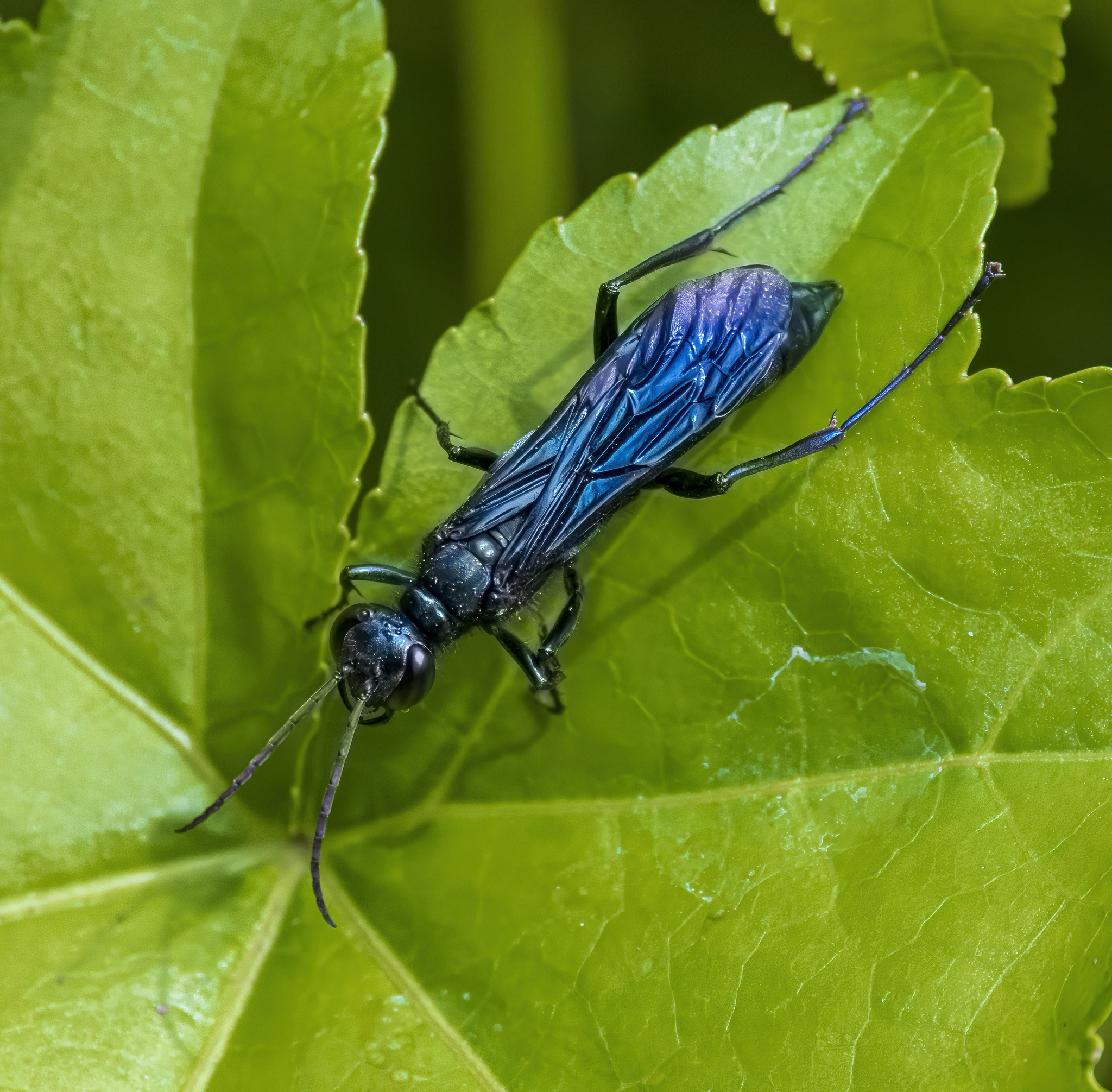
C. (Chalybion) californicum in North Carolina.

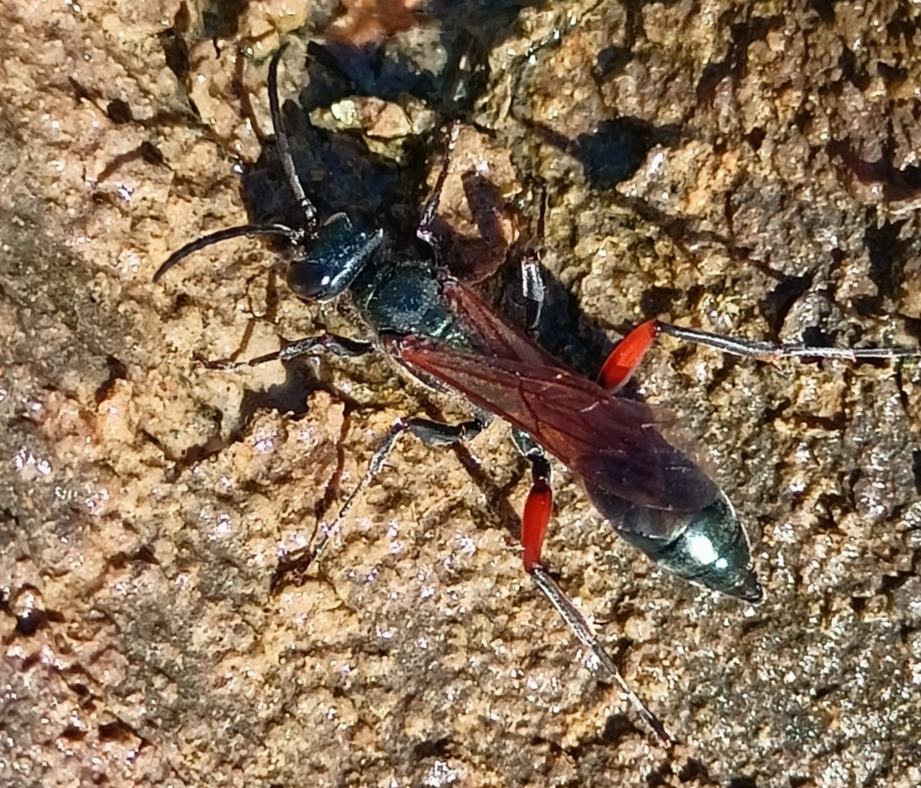
C. (Chalybion) femoratum in Italy.

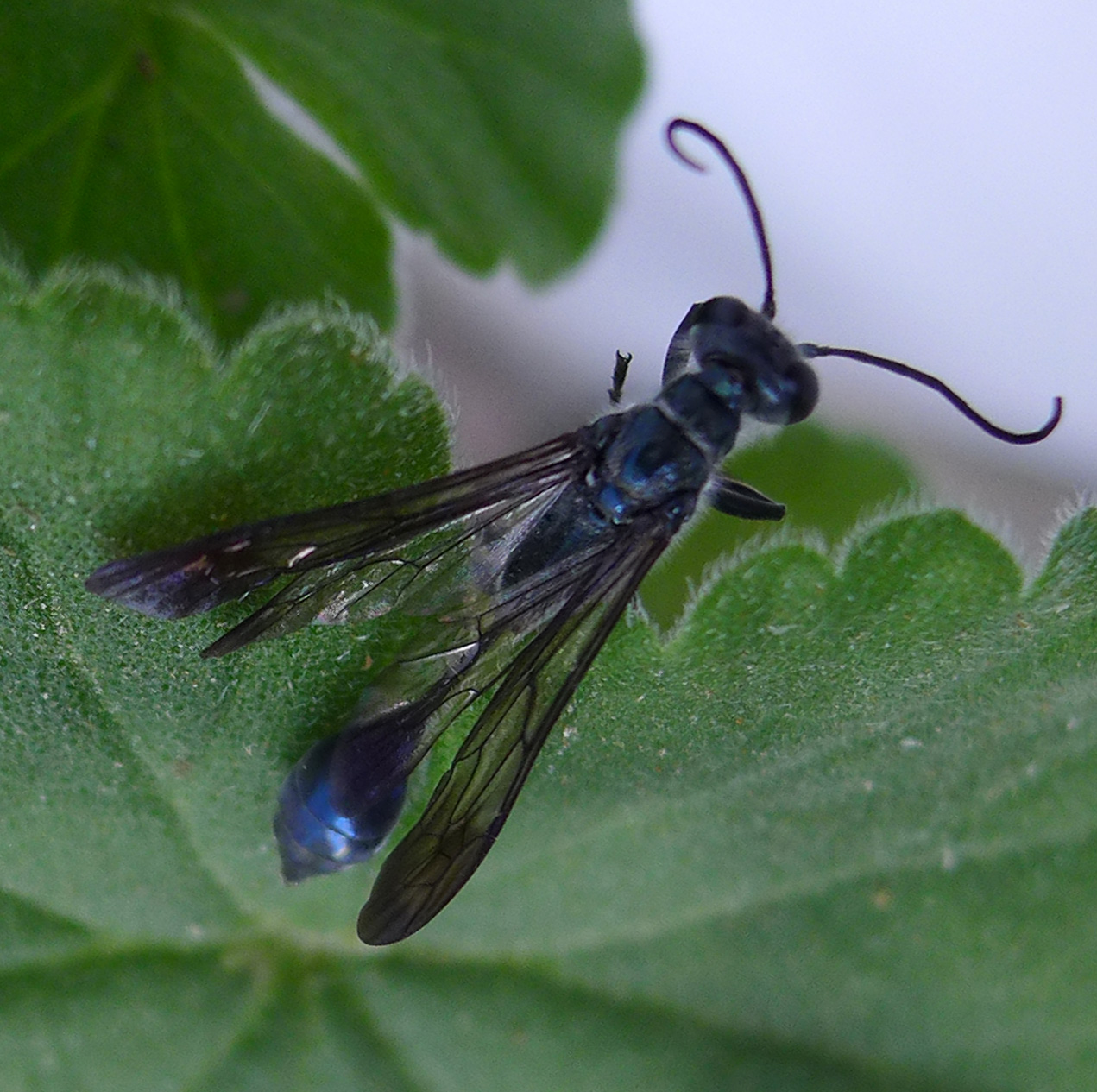
C. (Chalybion) flebile in Spain.

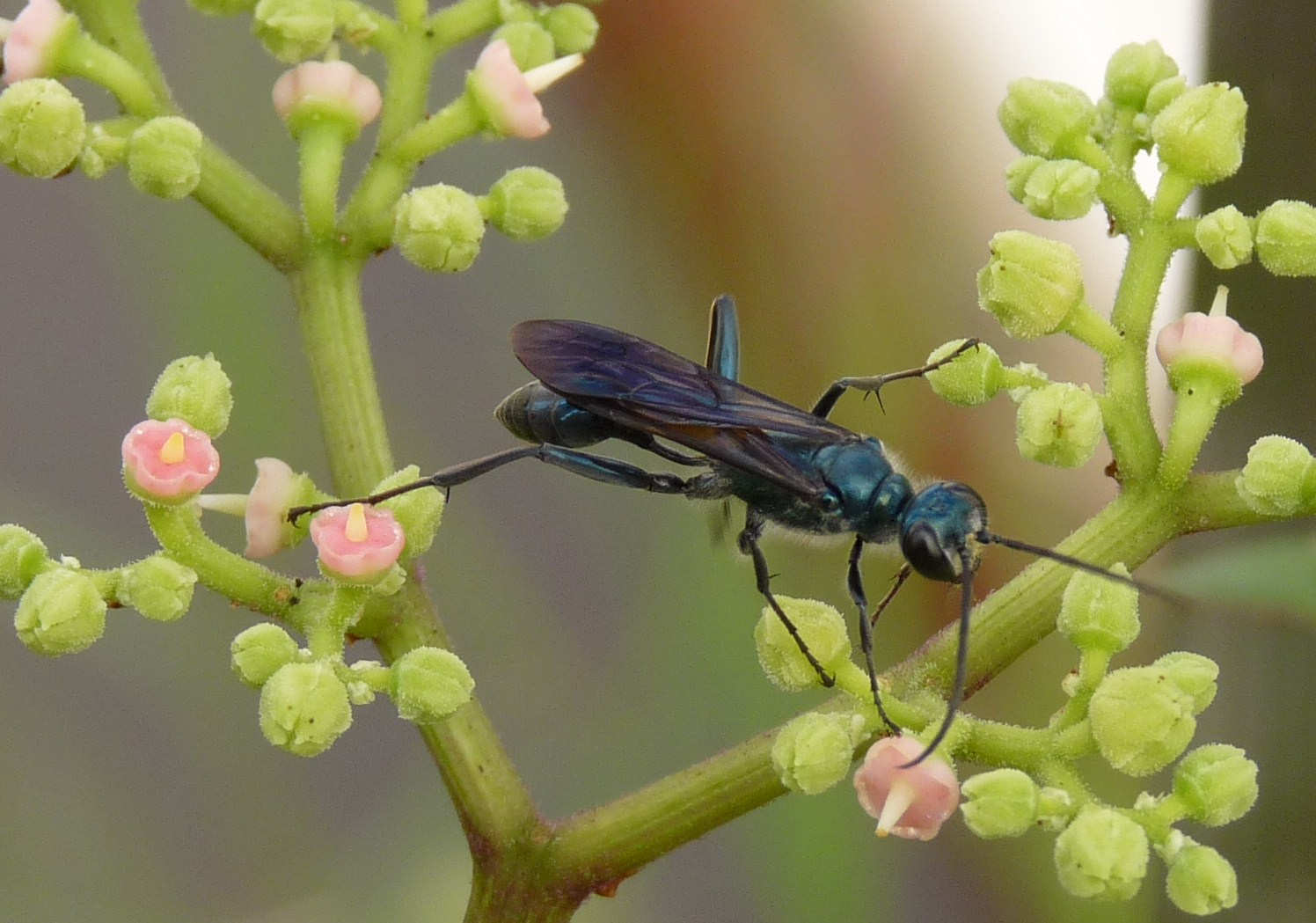
C. (Chalybion) japonicum in Japan.

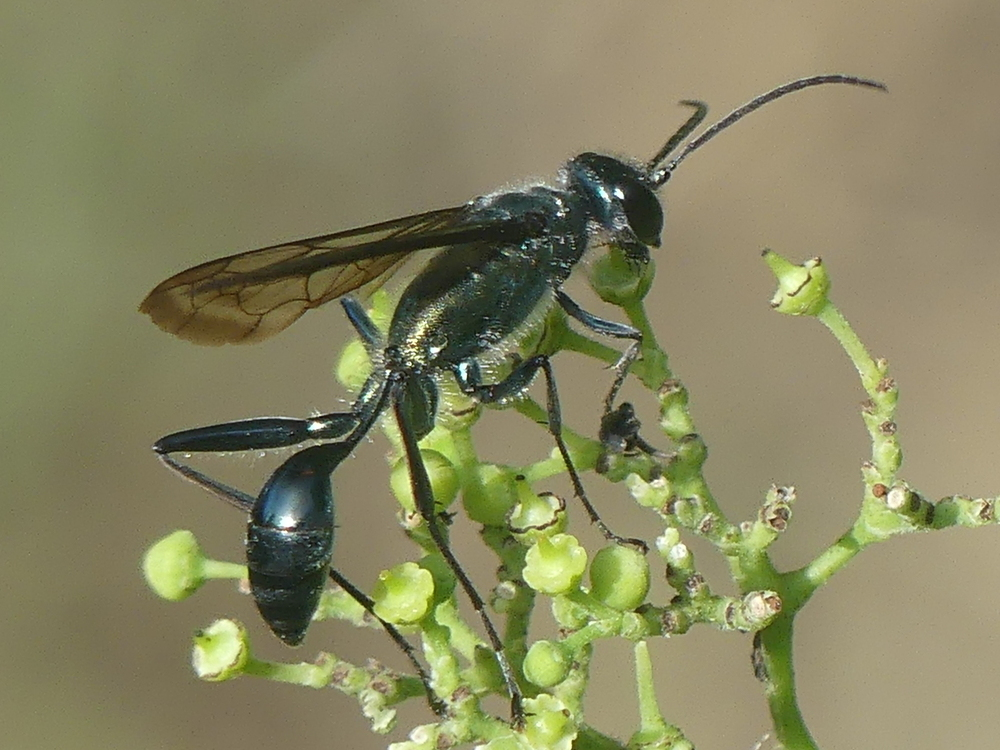
C. (Chalybion) zimmermanni aztecum in Texas.

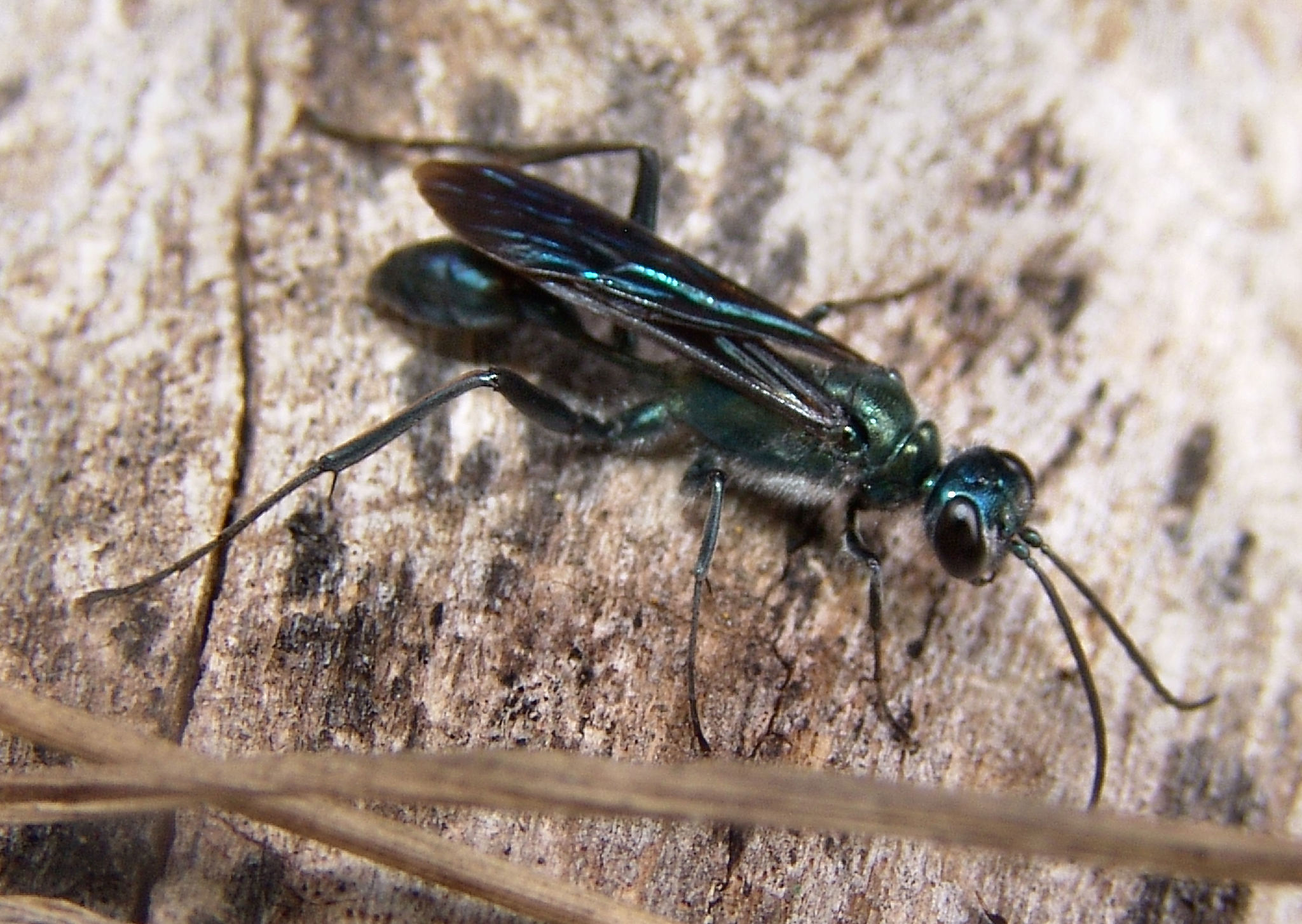
C. (Chalybion) zimmermanni zimmermanni in Arkansas.
