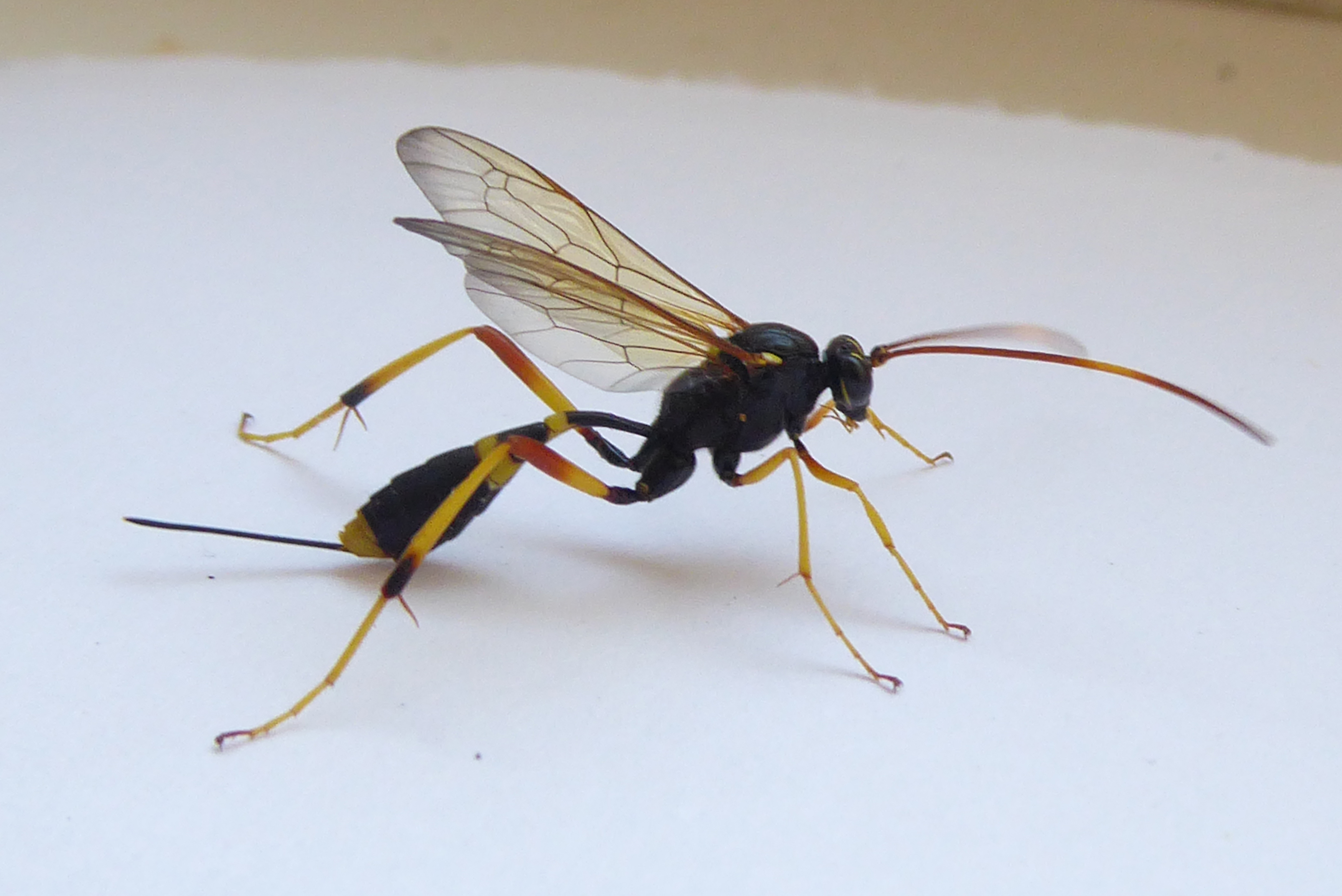
- Acroricnus seductor

Scientific classification
- Kingdom: Animalia
- Phylum: Arthropoda
- Class: Insecta
- Order: Hymenoptera
- Family: Ichneumonidae
- Subfamily: Cryptinae
- Genus: Acroricnus; Ratzeburg, 1852

= Acroricnus =

Genus of wasps

Acroricnus is a genus of wasps belonging to the family Ichneumonidae.

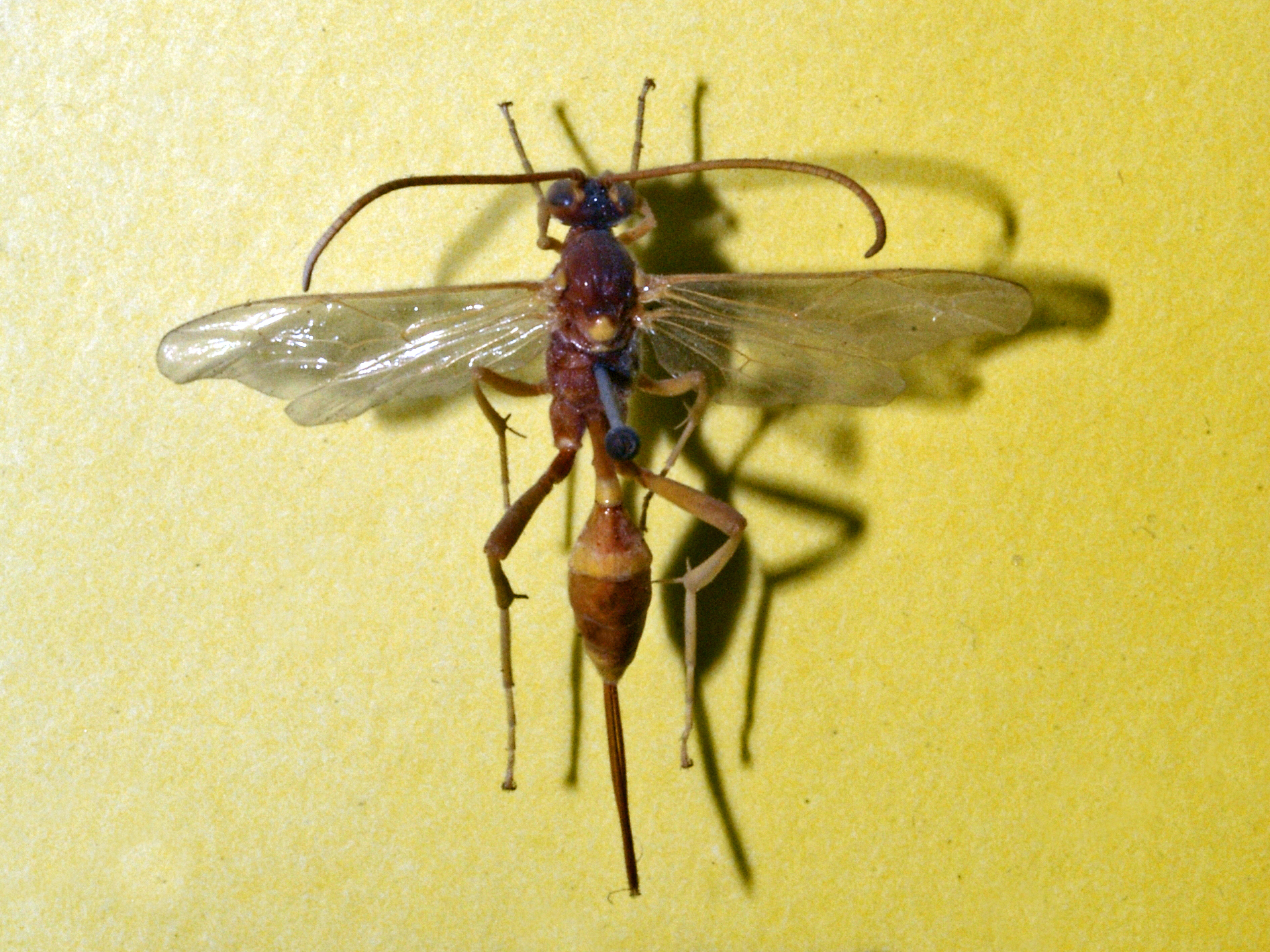
Acroricnus seductor

== Species ==
Species within this genus include:

- Acroricnus ambulator
- Acroricnus cubensis
- Acroricnus japonicus
- Acroricnus nigriscutellatus
- Acroricnus peronatus
- Acroricnus seductor
- Acroricnus stylator
- Acroricnus tricolor
