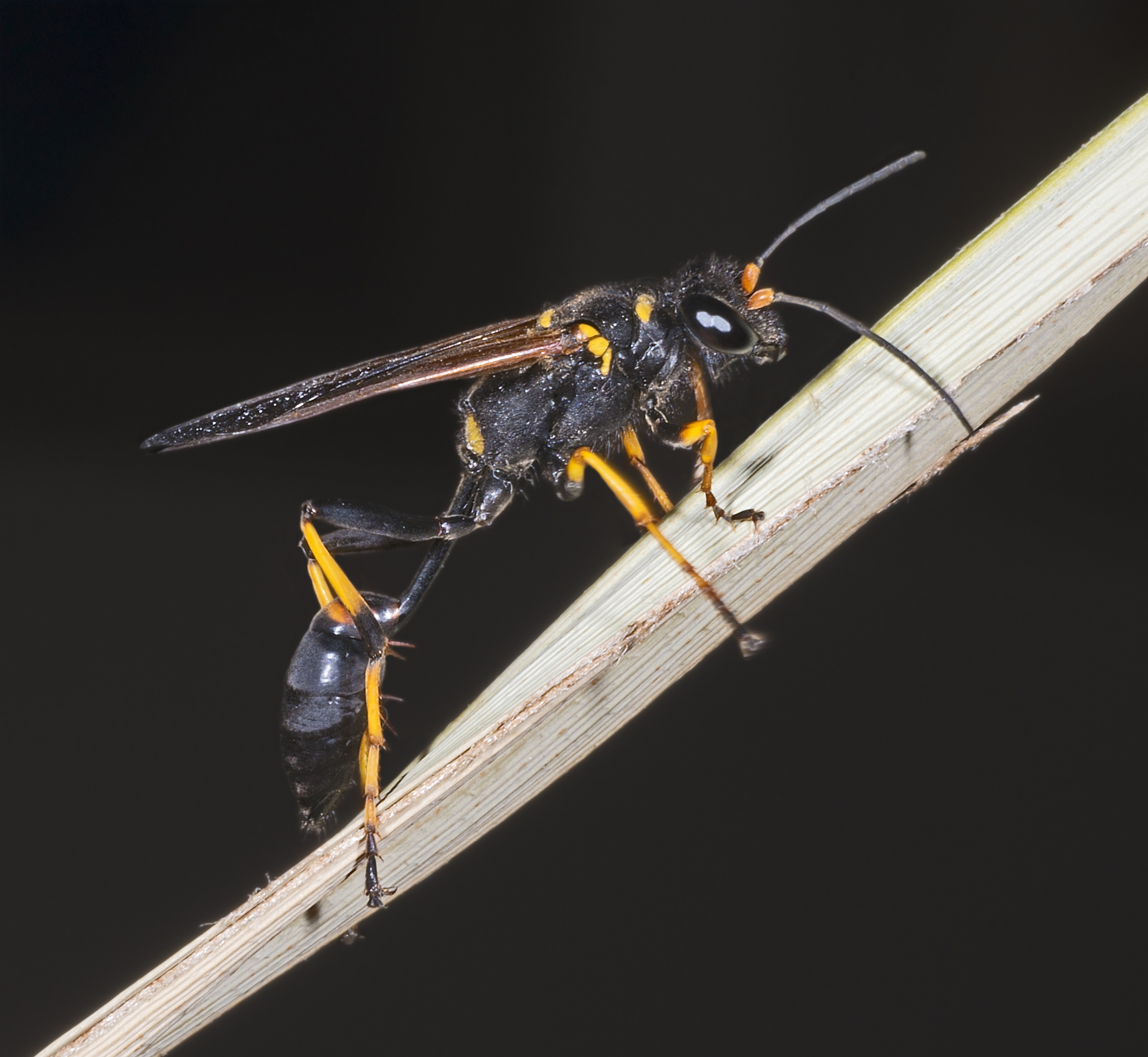

Scientific classification
- Kingdom: Animalia
- Phylum: Arthropoda
- Clade: Pancrustacea
- Class: Insecta
- Order: Hymenoptera
- Family: Sphecidae
- Tribe: Sceliphrini
- Genus: Sceliphron
- Species: S. caementarium

Binomial name
- Sceliphron caementarium (Drury, 1773)

Synonyms
- Sphex caementarius Drury, 1773; Sphex flavomaculatus DeGeer, 1773; Sphex lunatus Fabricius, 1775; Sphex flavipes Fabricius, 1781; Sphex flavipunctatus Christ, 1791; Sphex affinis Fabricius, 1793; Pelopoeus lunatus (Fabricius, 1775); Pelopoeus flavipes (Fabricius, 1781); Pelopoeus affinis (Fabricius, 1793); Pelopoeus architectus Lepeletier, 1845; Pelopoeus servillei Lepeletier, 1845; Pelopoeus solieri Lepeletier, 1845; Pelopoeus canadensis F. Smith, 1856; Pelopoeus caementarius (Drury, 1773); Pelopoeus nigriventris A. Costa, 1864; Pelopoeus caementarius var. lunatus (Fabricius, 1775); Pelopoeus caementarius var. flavipes (Fabricius, 1781); Pelopoeus caementarius var. architectus (Lepeletier, 1845); Pelopoeus tahitensis de Saussure, 1867; Sceliphron caementarium var. lunatus (Fabricius, 1775); Sceliphron caementarium flavomaculatus (DeGeer, 1773); Sceliphron caementarium var. flavipes (Fabricius, 1781); Sceliphron caementarium var. flavipunctatum (Christ, 1791); Sceliphron affine (Fabricius, 1793); Sceliphron servillei (Lepeletier, 1845); Sceliphron solieri (Lepeletier, 1845); Sceliphron nigriventre (A. Costa, 1864); Sceliphron tahitensis (de Saussure, 1867); Sceliphron caementarium var. canadensis (F. Smith, 1856); Sceliphron caementarium var. servillei (Lepeletier, 1845); Sceliphron caementarium var. nigriventre (A. Costa, 1864); Sphex economicus Curtiss, 1938; Sceliphron caementarium var. affine (Fabricius, 1793)

= Sceliphron caementarium =

Yellow-legged mud-dauber wasp

Species of wasp

Sceliphron caementarium, also known as the yellow-legged mud-dauber wasp (within the US) or black-waisted mud-dauber wasp (outside of the US), is a species of sphecid wasp.

There are 33 other species of Sceliphron that occur throughout the world, though in appearance and habits they are quite similar to S. caementarium.

== Etymology ==
The Latin species word caementārius means "mason" or "builder of walls."

== Distribution and habitat ==
S. caementarium is widespread in Canada, the United States, Central America and the West Indies, and has been introduced to many Pacific Islands (including Australia, Hawaii, and Japan), Peru and Europe, where it has become established in some countries of the Mediterranean Basin (Croatia, France and Corsica, Italy, Cyprus, Malta, the Canary Islands, and Madeira) and Austria, Bulgaria, and Ukraine.

This species is found in a wide variety of habitats, such as rock ledges, man-made structures, puddles and other water edges, cypress domes, in long leaf pines (Pinus palustris), and in turkey oaks.

== Description ==
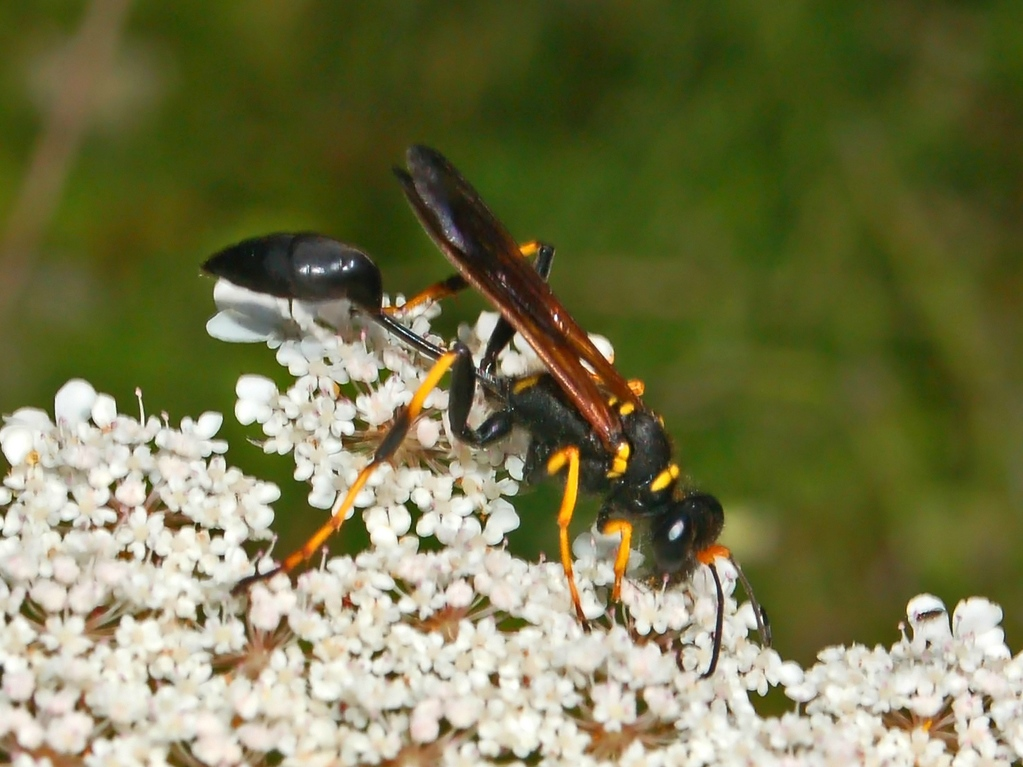
Female of Sceliphron caementarium feeding on nectar

Sceliphron caementarium can reach a length of 24–28 mm (15/16–1 3/32 in). Their petiole is generally black and is about half the length of the entire abdomen, however the population in the desert southwest often has a yellow petiole. > The thorax shows various yellow markings, while the abdomen is normally black, with yellow propodeum (typical of females). The eyes are black, the antennae are black with yellow scapes, and the legs are yellow with black trochanters and femurs. Within the United States, it is the only species in its genus with yellow-marked legs. The wings are a tawny color.

== Biology ==
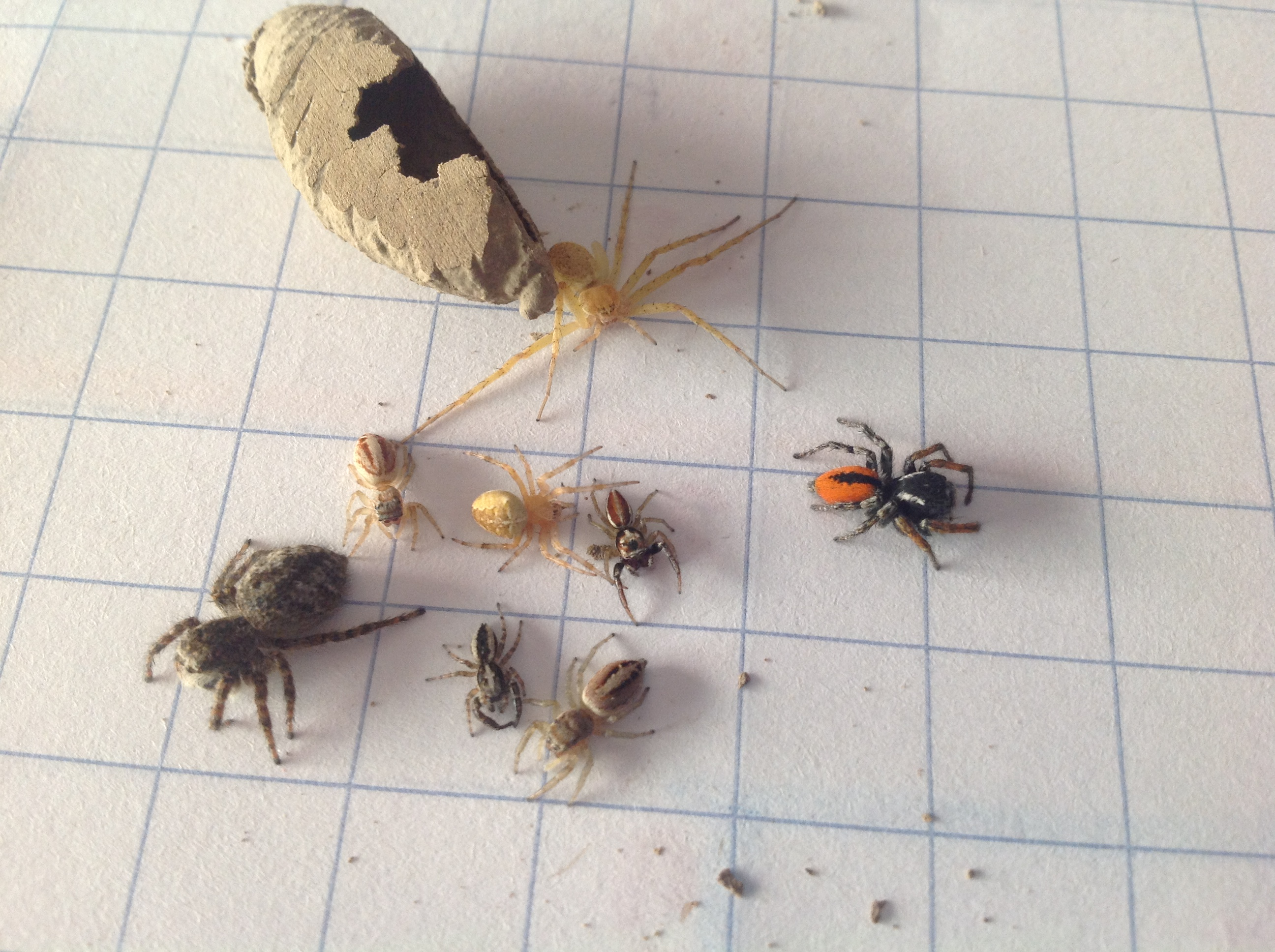
Paralyzed spiders used as larval provisions collected from a nest

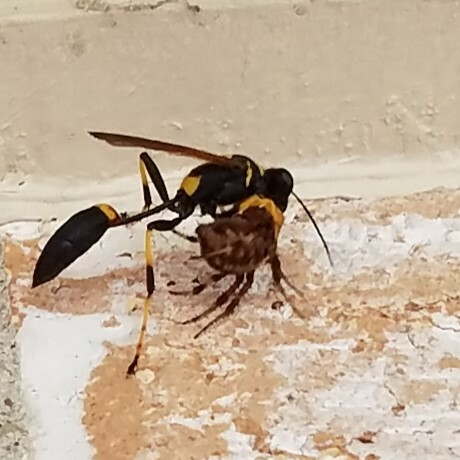
Carrying a spider

Yellow-legged mud-dauber wasps are solitary parasitoid wasps that build nests out of mud. These sphecid wasps collect mud balls at puddle and pool edges for constructing nests. Frequently, nests are built in shaded areas inside formations that are sheltered from the weather or from other environmental elements. These sites may be naturally occurring, or man-made structures. Some examples are: under and inside various types of bridges, barns, garages, open-air porches, or under housing eaves. The nests comprise up to 25 vertically arranged, individual cylindrical cells. After initial creation and covering of the clutch, this sphecid wasp uses more mud as a means of covering and protecting the whole cluster of cells, thereby forming a smooth appearance, and a uniform nest. The entire nest may attain an area equal to, or larger than, the size of an average human fist.

After building a cell of the nest, the female wasp captures several spiders. The captured prey are stung and paralyzed before being placed in the nest (usually 6–15 per cell), and then a single egg is deposited on the prey within each cell. The wasp then seals the cell with a thick mud plug. After finishing a series of cells, she leaves and does not return. While consuming the prey and increasing in size, the larva molts several times, until it molts into a pupa. Once the pupa has developed into an adult wasp, the adult emerges from its pupal case and breaks out of its mud chamber.

Adults can be seen in mid-summer feeding on nectar at flowers, especially Queen Anne's lace (Daucus carota), parsnips, and water parsnips (Sium suave, Sium latifolium, Berula erecta). They have a low reproductive rate. Stings are rare due to their solitary and usually nonaggressive nature.

A common species of cuckoo wasp, Chrysis angolensis, is frequently a kleptoparasite in Sceliphron nests.

=== Venom ===
Although they are common components of venoms: serotonin, histamine, acetylcholine, and kinins are absent from S. caementarium venom.

== Gallery ==
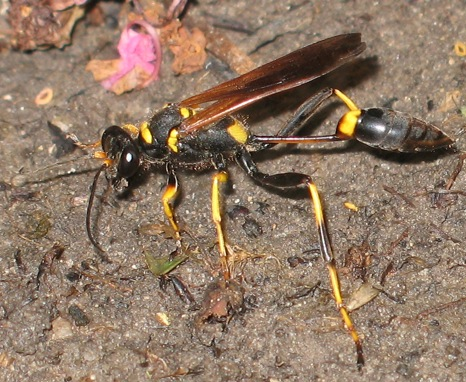
S. caementarium (forma caementarium) collecting mud

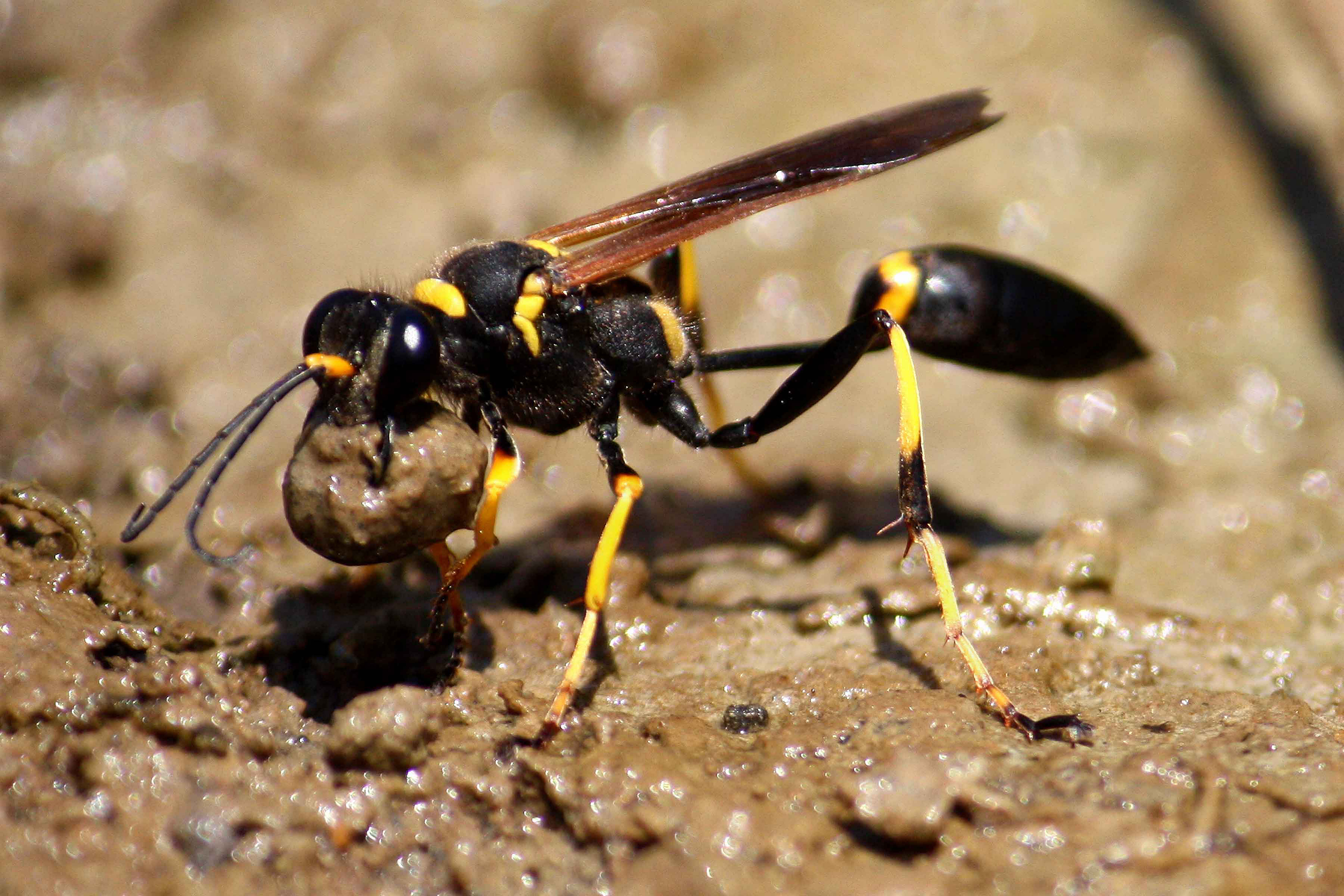
S. caementarium (forma caementarium) with a load of mud, just before takeoff

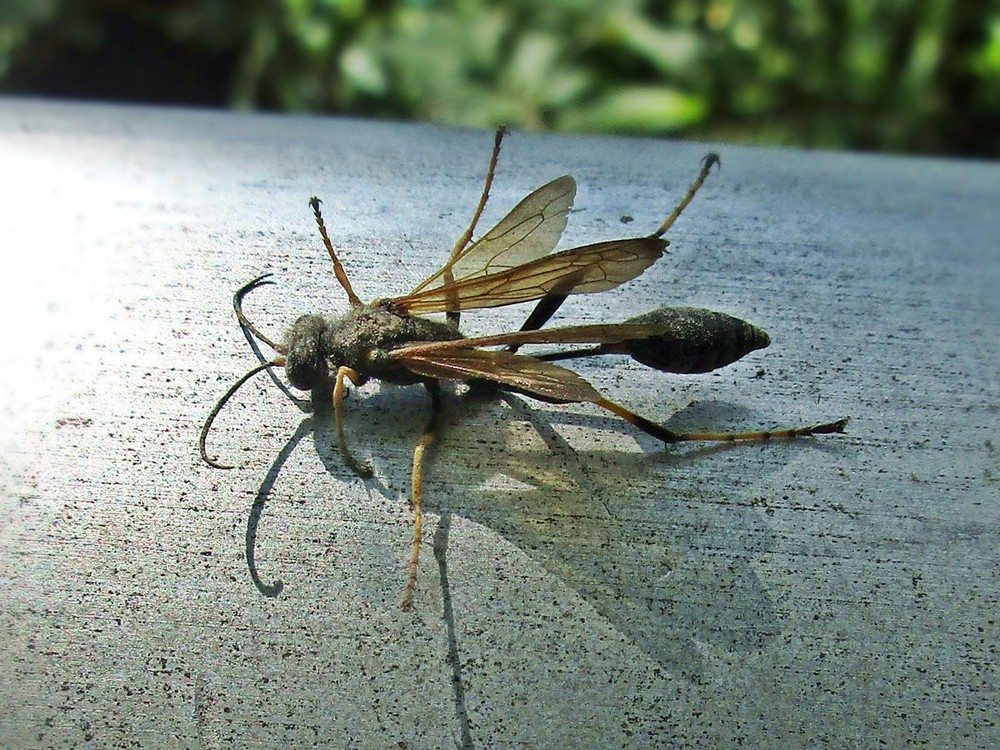
S. caementarium (forma flavipes) in New York with yellow body markings restricted to the tegulae

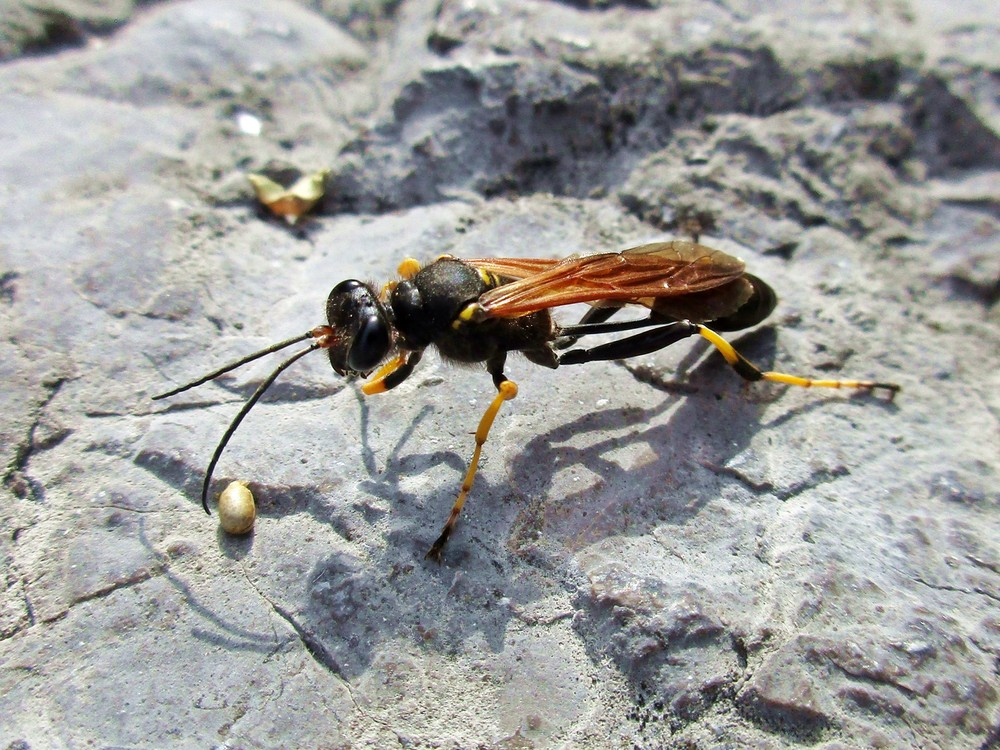
S. caementarium (forma affine) in New York with reduced yellow body markings

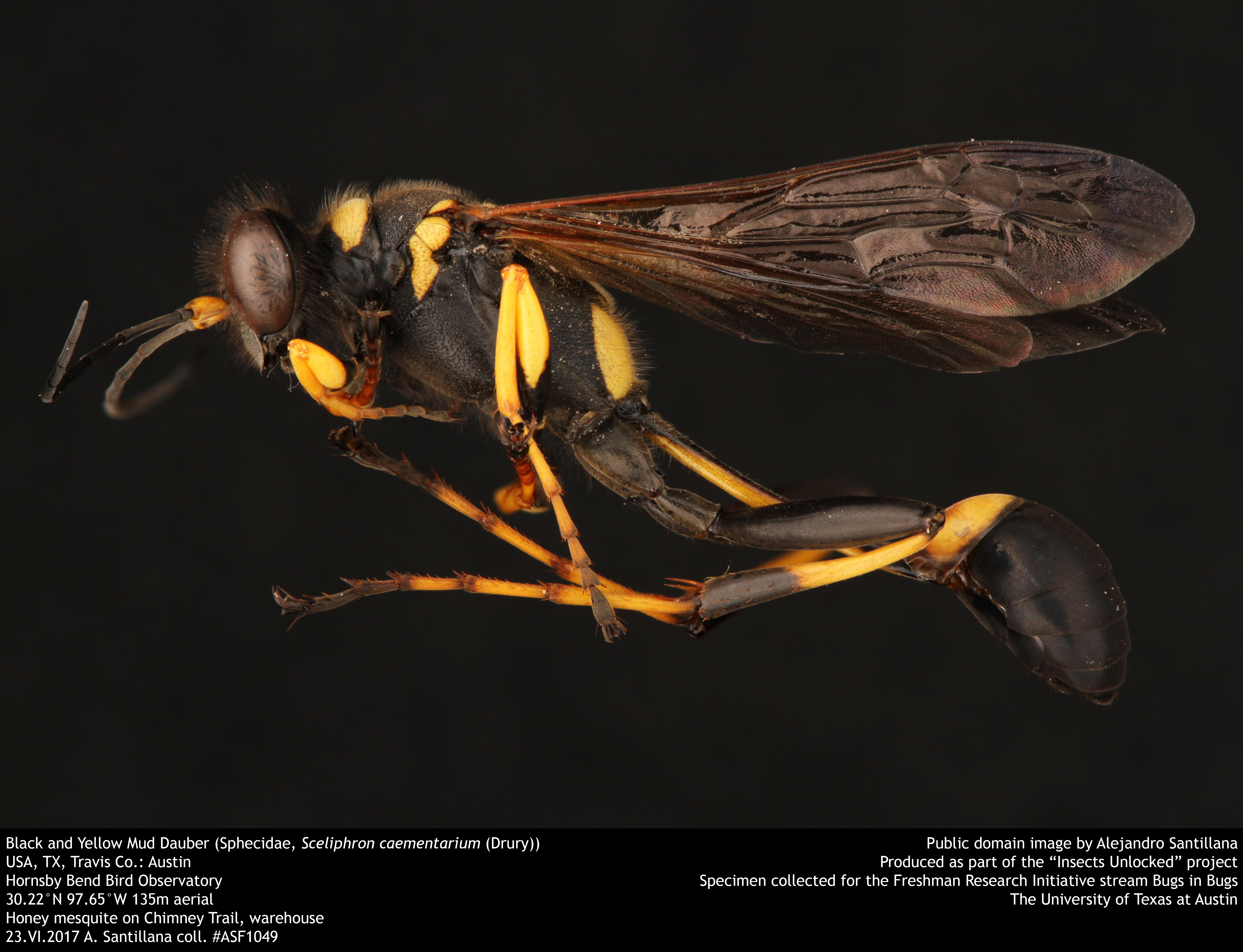
S. caementarium with a partially yellow petiole (forma servillei) from Austin, TX

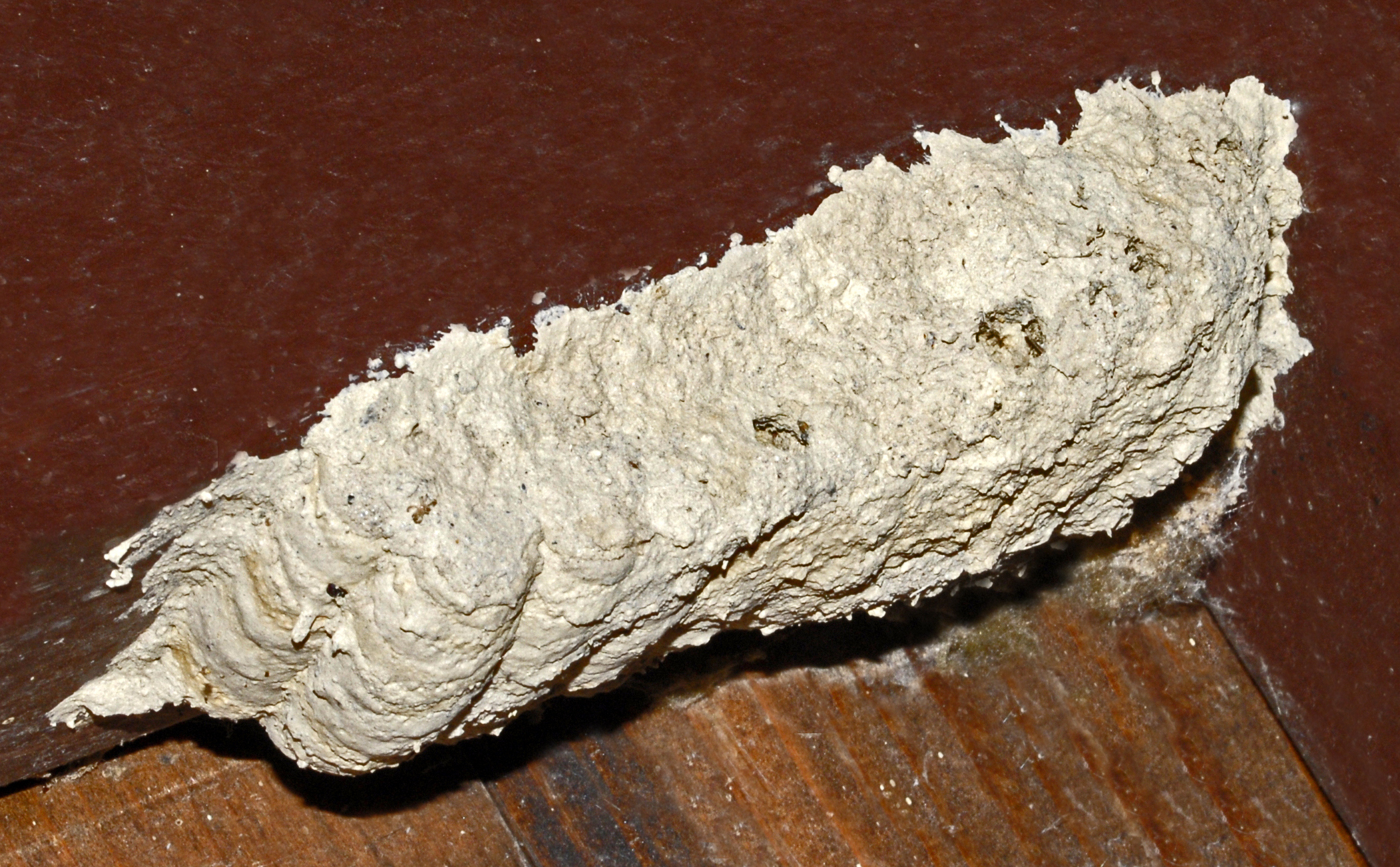
A nest containing the cells covered with mud
