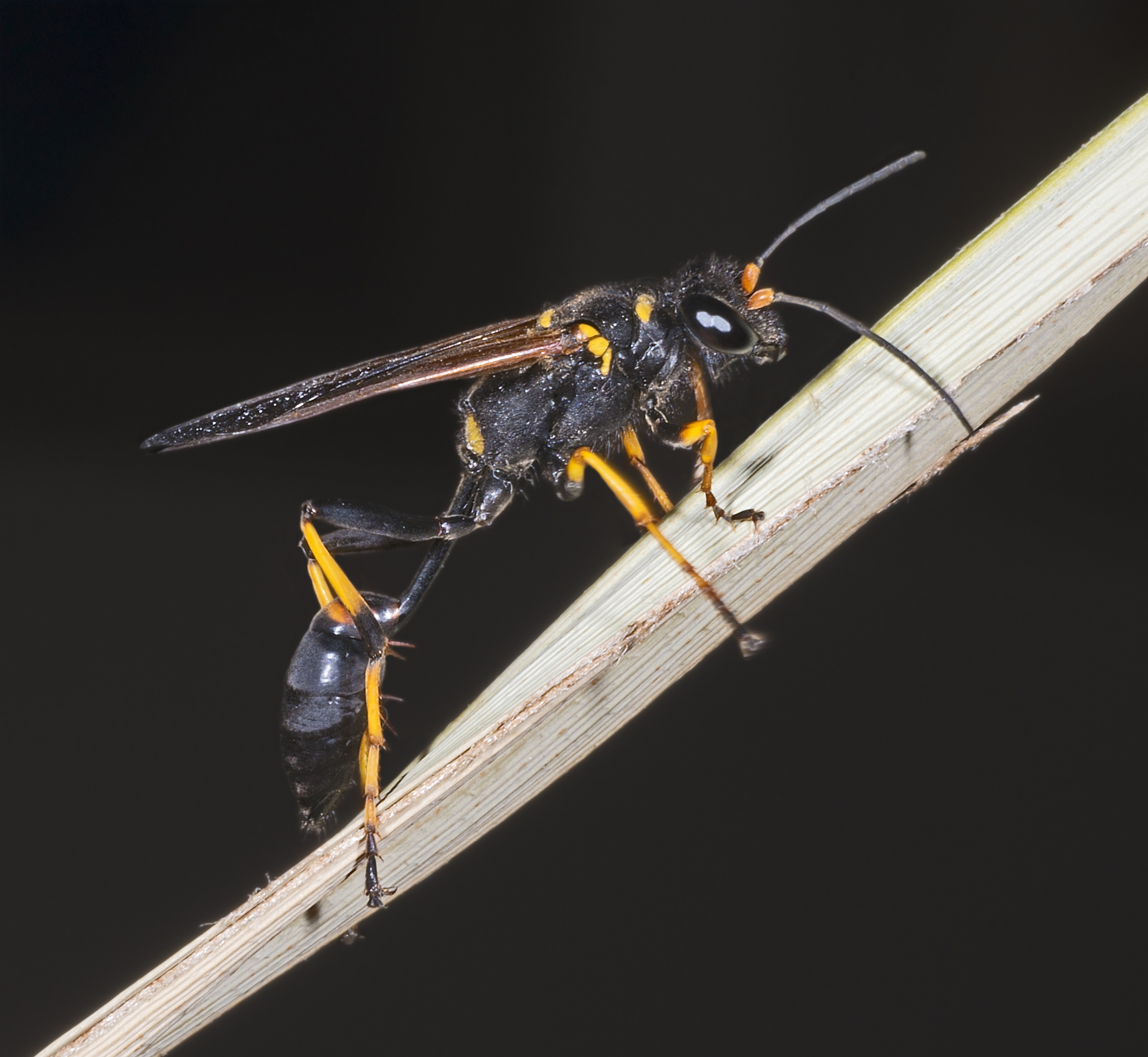
- Yellow-legged mud-dauber wasp (Sceliphron caementarium)

Scientific classification
- Kingdom: Animalia
- Phylum: Arthropoda
- Clade: Pancrustacea
- Class: Insecta
- Order: Hymenoptera
- Family: Sphecidae
- Subfamily: Sceliphrinae
- Tribe: Sceliphrini; Ashmead, 1899

Genera
- Chalybion Dahlbom, 1843; Sceliphron Klug, 1801

= Sceliphrini =

Tribe of wasps

Sceliphrini, also known as mud-dauber wasps, mud daubers, dirt daubers, or mud wasps, is a tribe of thread-waisted wasp that build their nests from mud. Their common name refers to the nests that are made by the female wasps, which consist of mud molded into place by the wasp's mandibles. Mud daubers are long, slender wasps about 1 inch (25 mm) in length. Mud daubers are not normally aggressive, but can become belligerent when threatened. Stings are uncommon.

== Behavior ==
=== Nesting ===
Mud-dauber wasps build several forms of mud nests containing cylindrical cells. The nests are often found on overhanging cliffs and buildings. In each species, each nest cell contains one egg and is provisioned with spiders. The black-and-yellow mud-dauber species in the genus Sceliphron construct their own mud nests. Those in the subgenus Sceliphron (Sceliphron) build nests with multiple cells that are all encased in a second layer of mud. Those in the subgenus Sceliphron (Hensenia) build nests with a single cell. The blue mud-dauber wasps in the genus Chalybion instead refurbish abandoned nests of other species.

Mud daubers may occupy the same sites year after year, creating large numbers of nests in protected locations; such sites are often used as nest sites by other kinds of wasps and bees, as well as other types of insects.

The young overwinter inside the nest.

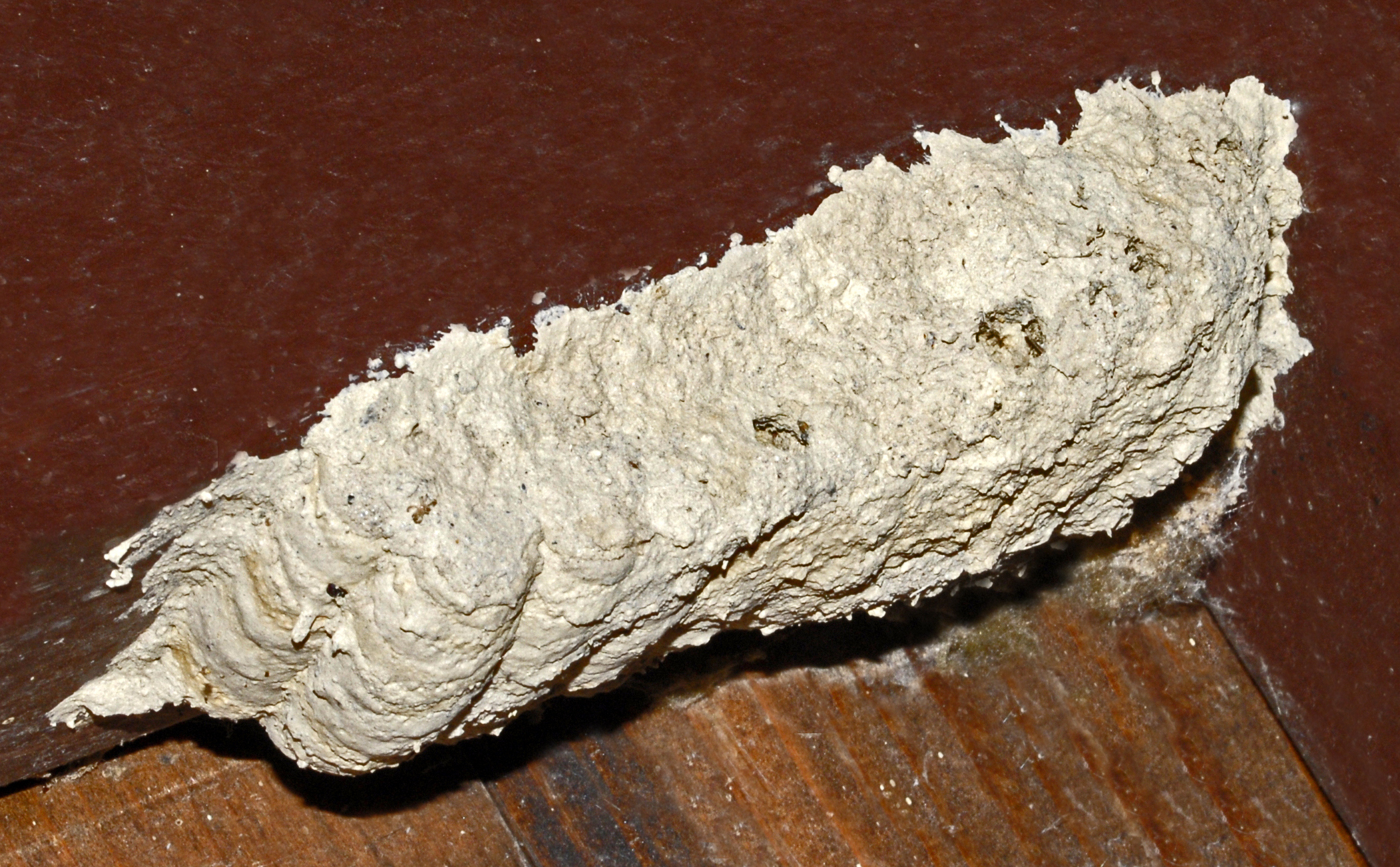
Sceliphron caementarium mud nest in Sant'Albano Stura, Cuneo, Italy.

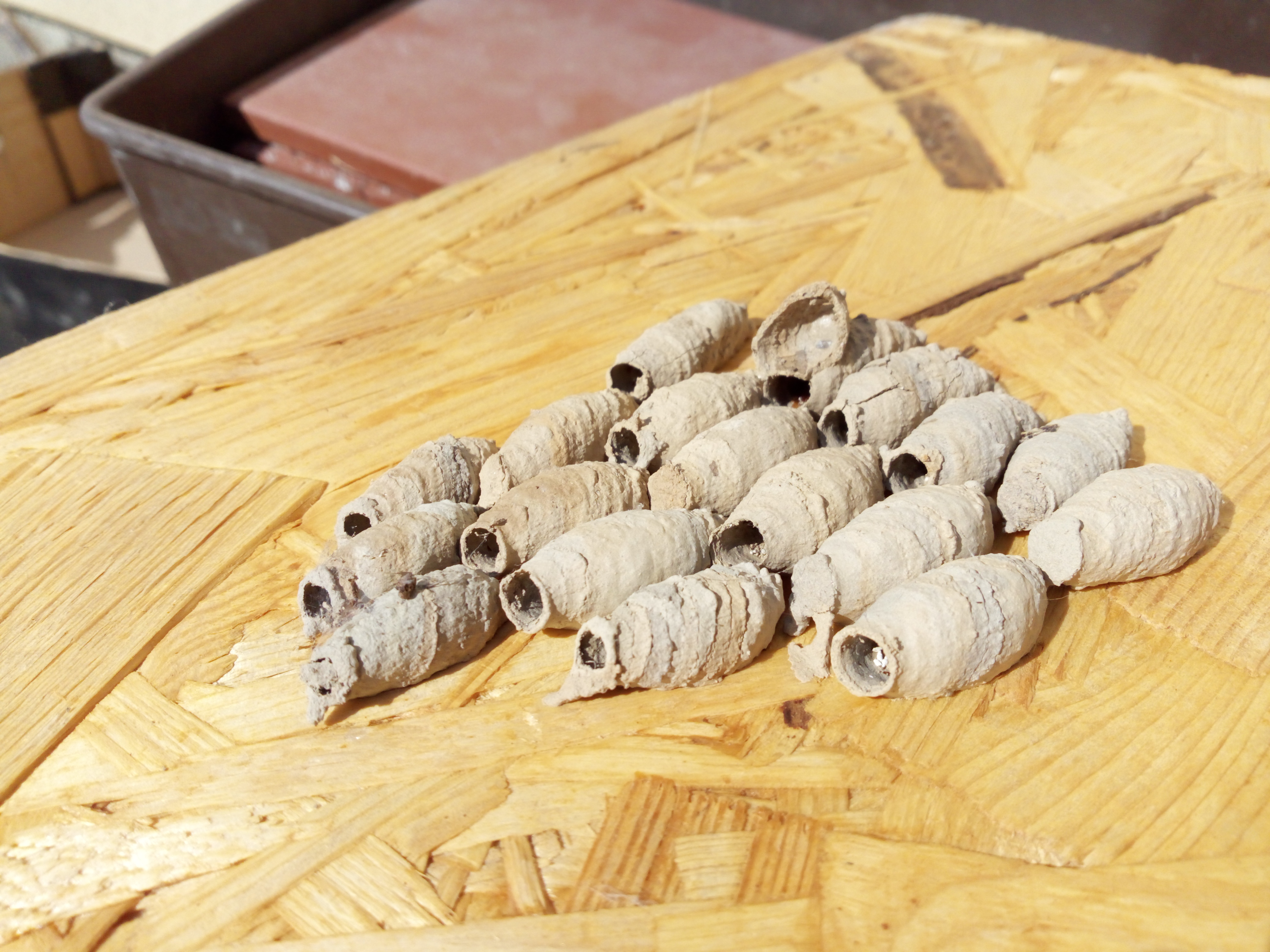
Sceliphron curvatum mud nests in the Czech Republic.

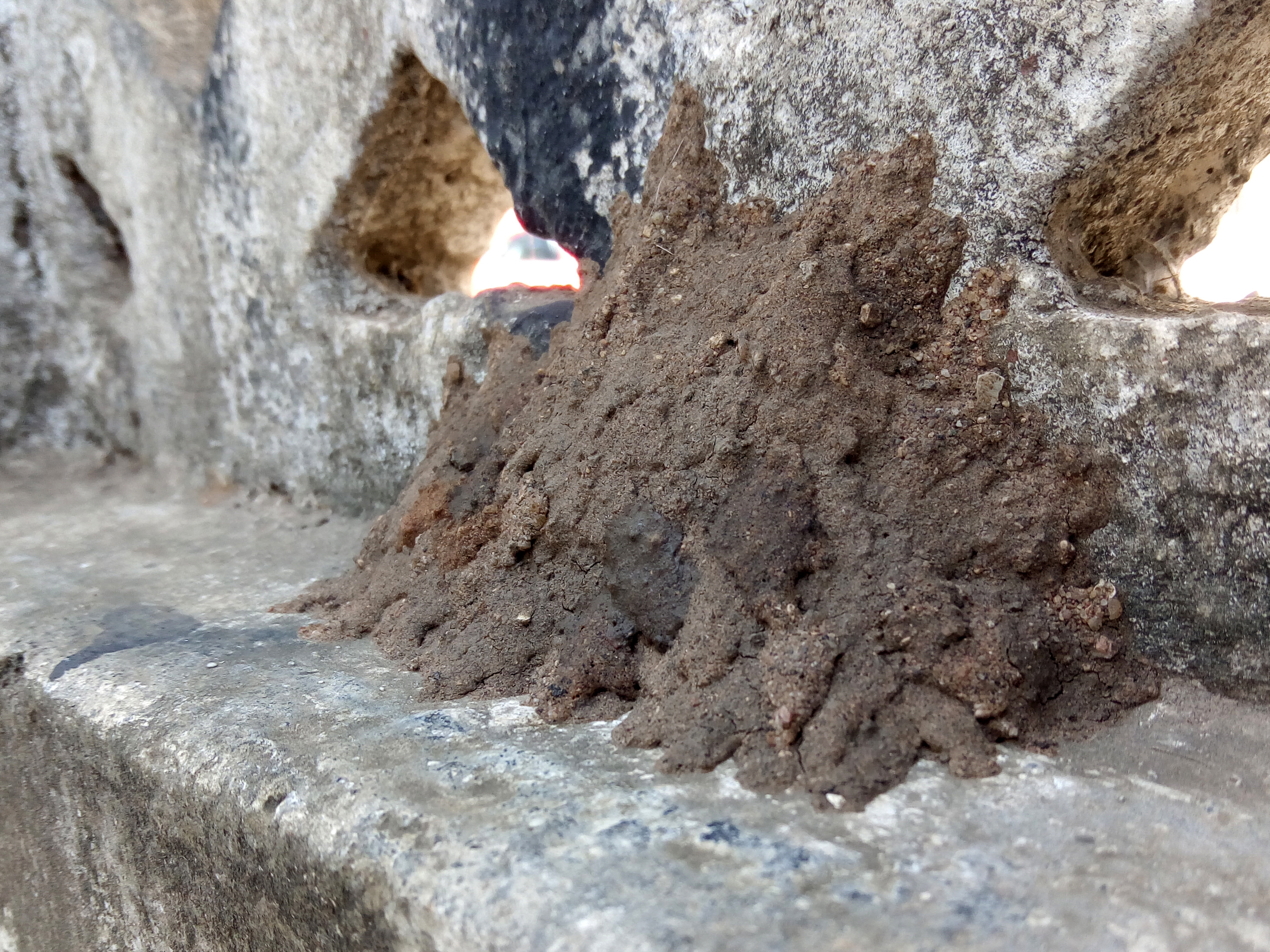
Chalybion sp. mud nest in Bhopal, India.

=== Diet ===
Mud-dauber wasps are parasitoid species in which the adults actively hunt and paralyze prey for their young, cramming as many as a couple dozen small spiders into each nest cell. Black-and-yellow mud-daubers primarily hunt relatively small, colorful spiders, such as crab spiders, orb weavers and some jumping spiders. Blue mud-daubers primarily hunt cobweb spiders, including widow spiders. The wasp often shakes the web pretending to be caught in order to lure out the host spider. To capture a spider, the wasp grabs it and stings it. The venom from the sting does not kill the spider, but paralyzes and preserves it so it can be transported and stored in a nest cell until consumed by the larva. A mud dauber usually lays its egg on the prey item and then seals it into the nest cell with a mud cap.

Adults of both sexes frequently drink flower nectar.

== Interactions with other species ==
One disadvantage to making nests is that most, if not all of the nest-maker’s offspring are concentrated in one place, making them highly vulnerable to predation. Once a predator finds a nest, it can plunder it cell by cell.

A variety of parasitoid wasps, ranging from extremely tiny chalcidoid wasps to larger, bright green cuckoo wasps, attack mud dauber nests. They are kleptoparasites of provisions and offspring as food for their own young.

== Relationship with humans ==
=== Florida Commuter Airlines Flight 65 ===
On September 12, 1980, Florida Commuter Airlines Flight 65 crashed on a flight from Palm Beach International Airport to Grand Bahama International Airport, killing all 34 people on board. Before the flight, a mud dauber's nest was discovered in a pitot tube of the airplane which was cleaned by maintenance using an unapproved method. Although the NTSB could not determine the cause of the accident, one of the possible factors was the improper cleaning of the mud dauber nest from the pitot tube.

=== Birgenair Flight 301 ===
On February 6, 1996, Birgenair Flight 301, a 757 jet flying from Puerto Plata in the Dominican Republic, crashed into the Atlantic Ocean. All 13 crew members and 176 passengers were killed. A key part of the accident was a blocked pitot tube. Although the tubes were never recovered from the ocean floor, the plane had been sitting on the tarmac for 25 days with uncovered pitot tubes. Investigators believe a black and yellow mud dauber, Sceliphron, got into the tube and built its cylindrical nest inside, causing faulty air-speed readings that were a large part of the crash.

=== Gulfstream N450KK ===
On April 10, 2015, about 18:45 Eastern Daylight Time, a Gulfstream Aerospace G-IV, N450KK, was substantially damaged during a cabin over-pressurization event over the Caribbean Sea while en route to Fort Lauderdale, Florida. An initial examination of the fuselage revealed that the outflow valve safety port, located on the outer fuselage, was completely plugged with a foreign material resembling dried soil from a mud dauber.

== See also ==
- Trypoxylon politum (Organ pipe mud-dauber wasp)
- Eumeninae (Potter wasps)
- Ageniellini (Mud-nesting spider wasps)
- Liostenogaster flavolineata (tropical hover wasp)
