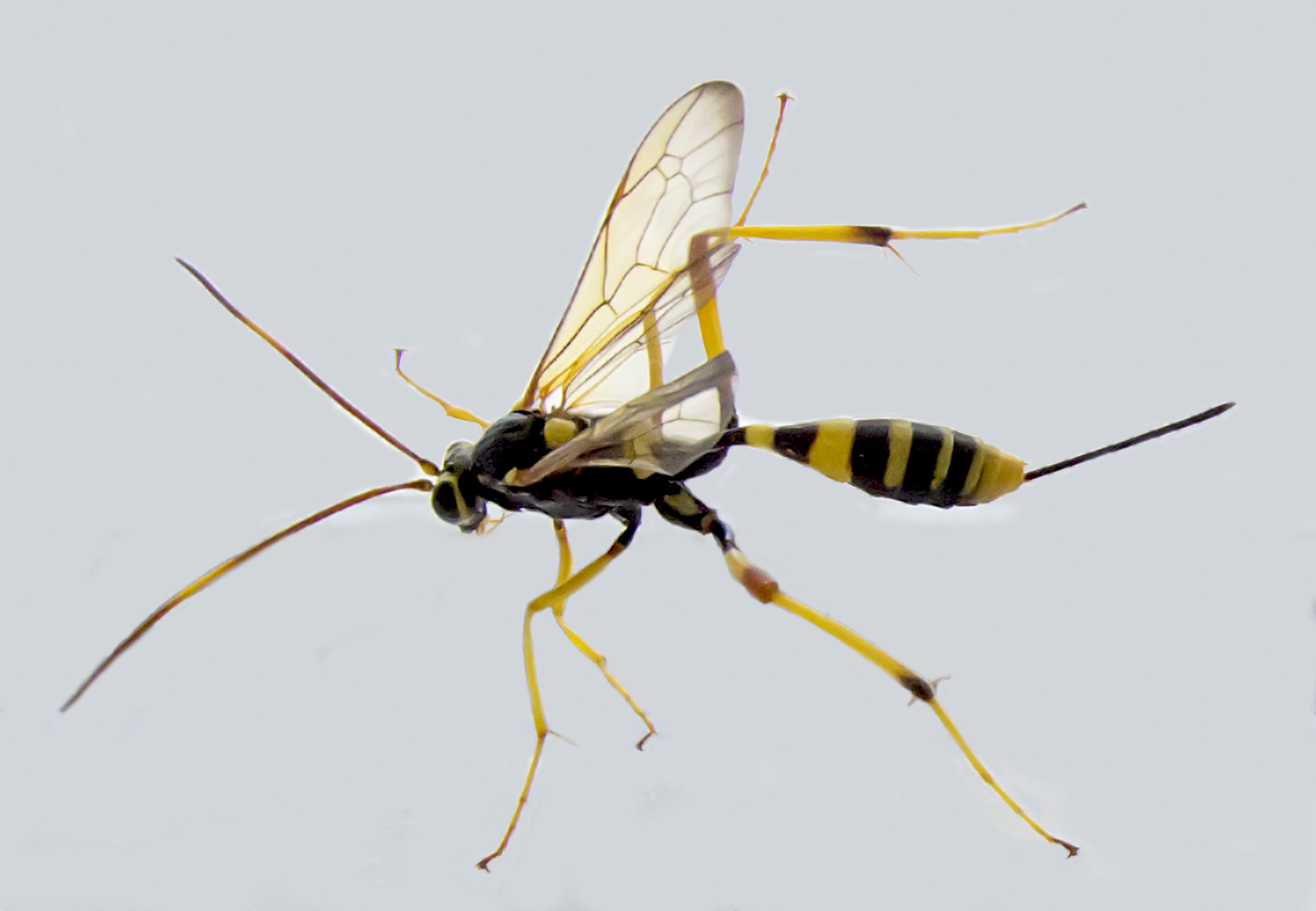
- Acroricnus sp.

Scientific classification
- Kingdom: Animalia
- Phylum: Arthropoda
- Clade: Pancrustacea
- Class: Insecta
- Order: Hymenoptera
- Family: Ichneumonidae
- Subfamily: Cryptinae; Kirby, 1837

Tribes
- Aptesini; Cryptini

Synonyms
- Gelinae Viereck, 1918 (in part); Hemitelinae Förster, 1869 (in part); Phygadeuontinae Förster, 1868 (in part)

= Cryptinae =

Subfamily of wasps

Cryptinae is a subfamily of wasps in the family Ichneumonidae. The family has also been called Gelinae, Hemitelinae, and Phygadeuontinae by various authorities, though the Phygadeuontinae have since been elevated to a separate subfamily.

== Description ==
Species are distributed worldwide. A 5-sided areolet, a short sternaulus, and a puffy face with a convex clypeus are diagnostic characters for most members of this large subfamily.

== Taxonomy ==
Gelinae was the name used by H. K. Townes in 1969. Fitton and Gauld's review of ichneumonid families synonymized Gelinae under Hemitelinae in 1976 and later as Phygadeuontinae in 1978. However, due to the decision of International Code of Zoological Nomenclature's Opinion 1715 in 1994 to conserve the status of the genus Cryptus Fabricius, 1804, both Gelinae and Phygadeuontinae became junior synonyms for Cryptinae. Santos later restricted the family in 2017 to only include the tribes Aptesini and Cryptini, forming the separate subfamilies Claseinae and Phygadeuontinae for the remaining tribes of Claseini (1 genus) and Phygadeuontini (123 genera), respectively.

There are about 273 genera in Cryptinae between the tribes of Aptesini and Cryptini.

== Classification ==
The following classification of Phygadeuontini is based on Wahl (2014):

=== Tribe Cryptini ===
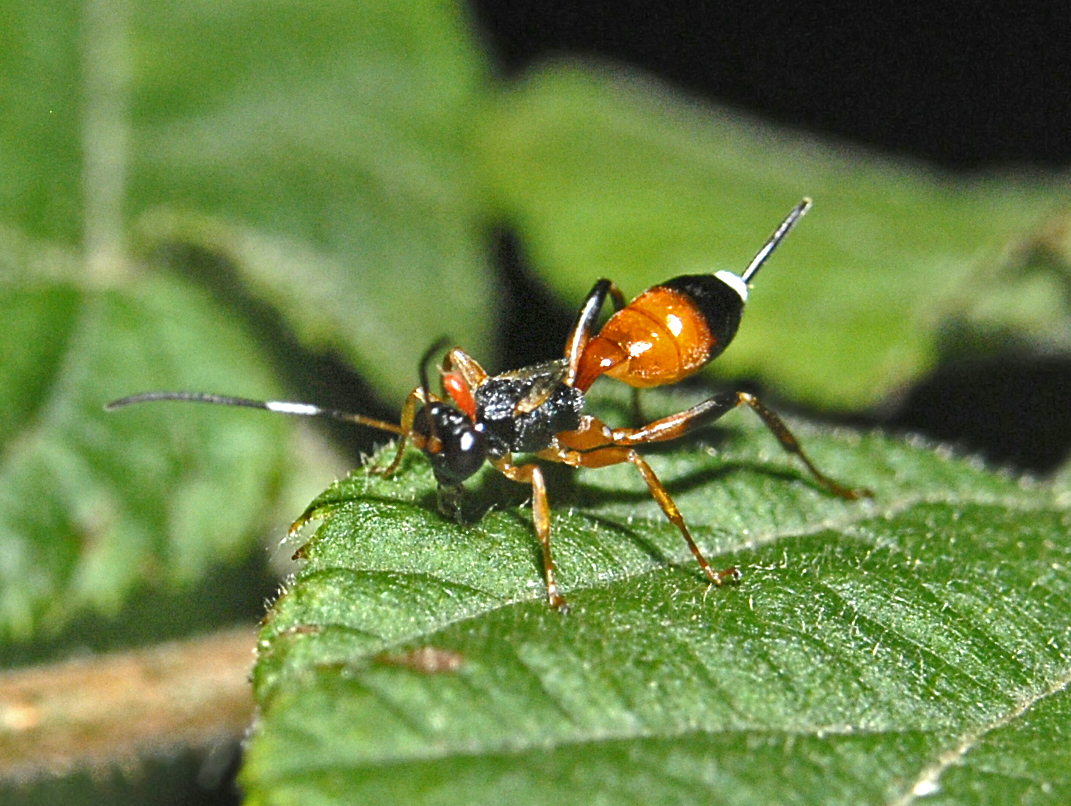
Agrothereutes abbreviatus, female

- Subtribe Agrothereutina
  - Agrothereutes Förster, 1850 — Holarctic
  - Amauromorpha Ashmead, 1905 — Oriental
  - Apsilops Förster, 1869 — Holarctic
  - Aritranis Förster, 1869 — Holarctic
  - Gambrus Förster, 1869 — Holarctic
  - Hidryta Förster, 1869 — Holarctic
  - Idiolispa Förster, 1869 — Holarctic
  - Mesostenidea Viereck, 1914 — Palearctic
  - Pycnocryptodes Aubert, 1971 — Palearctic
  - Pycnocryptus Thomson, 1873 — Holarctic
  - Thrybius Townes, 1965 — Palearctic
  - Trychosis Förster, 1869 — Holarctic, Oriental
- Subtribe Ateleutina
  - Ateleute Förster, 1869 — worldwide
  - Tamaulipeca Kasparyan & Hernandez, 2001 — Neotropical
- Subtribe Baryceratina
  - Baryceros Gravenhorst, 1829 — Nearctic, Neotropical
  - Brussinocryptus Pagliano & Scarramozino, 1990 — Oriental, Palearctic
  - Buysmania Cheesman, 1941 — Oriental
  - Calaminus Townes, 1965 — Palearctic
  - Ceratomansa Cushman, 1922 — Australian
  - Chlorocryptus Cameron, 1903 — Oriental, Palearctic
  - Coccygodes Saussure, 1892 — Ethiopian
  - Jonathania Gupta, 1987 — Oriental
  - Lamprocryptidea Viereck, 1913 — Neotropical
  - Paragambrus Uchida, 1936 — Palearctic
  - Prionacis Townes, 1970a — Oriental
  - Whymperia Cameron, 1903 — Nearctic, Neotropical
- Subtribe Ceratocryptina
  - Acromia Townes, 1961b — Oriental
  - Afretha Seyrig, 1952 — Ethiopian
  - Aprix Townes, 1961b — Australian
  - Ceratocryptus Cameron, 1903 — Ethiopian, Oriental
  - Ceratodolius Seyrig, 1952 — Ethiopian
  - Chamula Townes, 1962 — Nearctic, Neotropical
  - Cheesmanella Ozdikmen, 2005 — Oriental
  - Cremnocryptus Cushman, 1945 — Australian, Oriental
  - Ecaepomia Wang, 2001 — Oriental
  - Fitatsia Seyrig, 1952 — Ethiopian, Oriental
  - Lipoprion Townes, 1970a — Oriental
  - Lorio Cheesman, 1936 — Oriental
  - Malaycromia Gupta, 1999 — Oriental
  - Neaprix Gauld, 1984 — Australian
  - Nematocryptus Roman, 1910 — Ethiopian, Oriental
  - Piasites Seyrig, 1952 — Ethiopian
  - Rambites Seyrig, 1952 — Ethiopian
  - Silsila Cameron, 1903 — Oriental
  - Thelodon Townes, 1961b — Australian, Oriental
  - Trachyglutus Townes, 1970a — Neotropical
  - Wuda Cheesman, 1936 — Oriental
- Subtribe Coesulina
  - Coesula Cameron, 1905 — Oriental
- Subtribe Cryptina

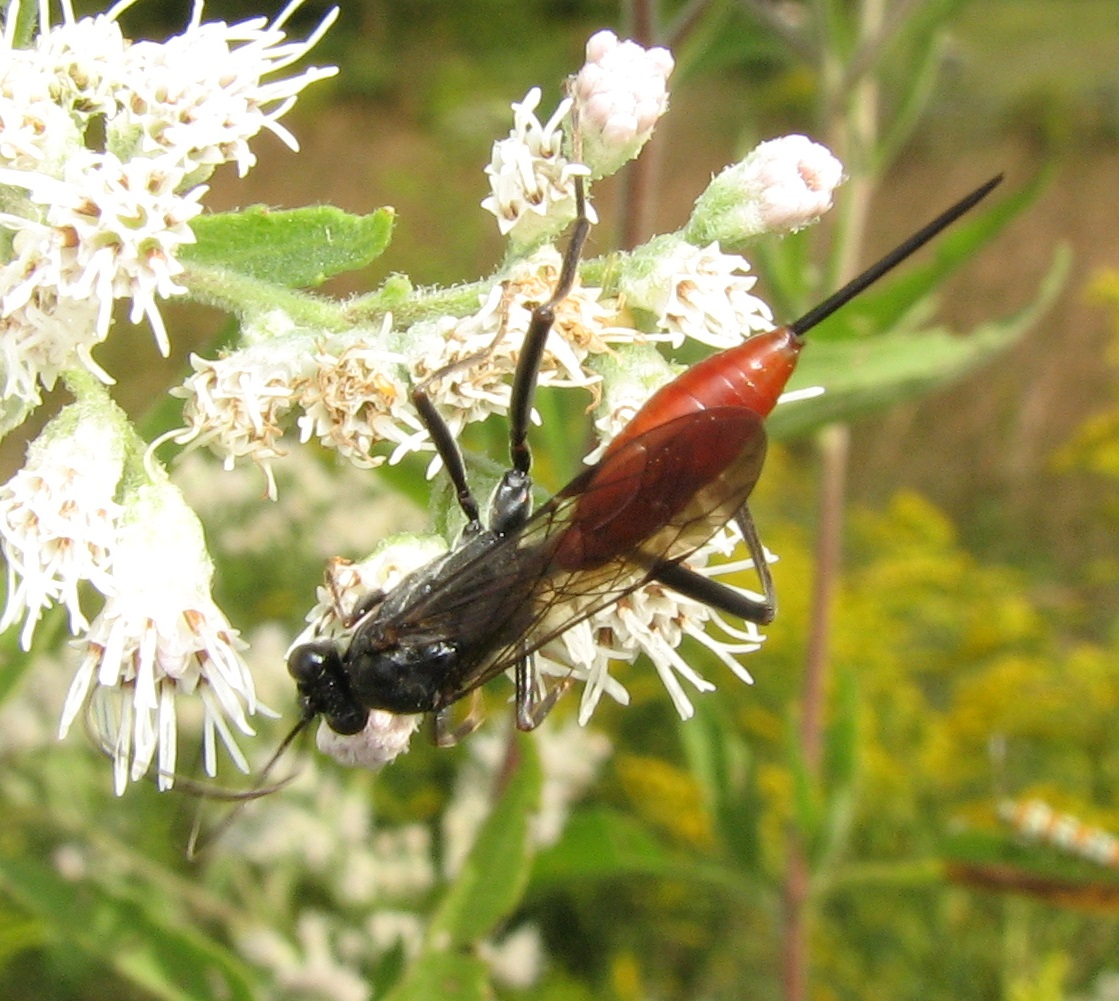
Cryptus albitarsis, female

  - Aeglocryptus Porter, 1987 — Neotropical
  - Aeliopotes Porter, 1985 — Neotropical
  - Aglaodina Porter, 1987 — Neotropical
  - Araucacis Porter, 1987 — Neotropical
  - Biconus Townes, 1970a — Neotropical
  - Buathra Cameron, 1903 — Holarctic, Oriental
  - Caenocryptoides Uchida, 1936 — Oriental, Palearctic
  - Caenocryptus Thomson, 1873 — Holarctic
  - Caenopelte Porter, 1967 — Neotropical
  - Camera Townes, 1962 — Nearctic, Neotropical
  - Chilecryptus Porter, 1987 — Neotropical
  - Chromocryptus Ashmead, 1900 — Neotropical
  - Compsocryptus Ashmead, 1900 — Nearctic, Neotropical
  - Cosmiocryptus Cameron, 1902 — Neotropical (Porter, 1987)
  - Cryptopteryx Ashmead, 1900 — Neotropical
  - Cryptus Fabricius, 1804 — Ethiopian, Holarctic, Oriental
  - Cyanodolius Seyrig, 1952 — Ethiopian
  - Cyanopelor Townes, 1973 — Ethiopian
  - Cyclaulus Townes, 1970a — Neotropical
  - Dihelus Townes, 1970a — Oriental, Palearctic
  - Diplohimas Townes, 1970a — Neotropical
  - Distictus Townes, 1966 — Neotropical
  - Dochmidium Porter, 1967 — Neotropical (Porter, 1987)
  - Dotocryptus Brèthes, (1918) 1919 — Neotropical
  - Enclisis Townes, 1970a — Palearctic
  - Etha Cameron, 1903 — Oriental
  - Gessia Townes, 1973 — Ethiopian
  - Glabridorsum Townes, 1970a — Australian, Oriental, Palearctic
  - Gyropyga Townes, 1970a — Oriental, Palearctic
  - Hedycryptus Cameron, 1903 — Oriental, Palearctic
  - Hypsanacis Porter, 1987 — Neotropical
  - Ischnus Gravenhorst, 1829 — worldwide
  - Itamuton Porter, 1987 — Neotropical
  - Joppidium Cresson, 1872 — Nearctic, Neotropical
  - Lanugo Townes, 1962 — Nearctic, Neotropical
  - Leptarthron Townes, 1970a — Neotropical
  - Meringopus Förster, 1869 — Holarctic
  - Mesophragis Seyrig, 1952 — Ethiopian
  - Monothela Townes, 1970a — Neotropical
  - Myrmecacis Porter, 1987 — Neotropical
  - Myrmeleonostenus Uchida, 1936 — Australian, Oriental, Palearctic
  - Nebostenus Gauld, 1984 — Australian
  - Nelophia Porter, 1967 — Neotropical
  - Neocryptopteryx Blanchard, 1947 — Neotropical (Porter, 1987)
  - Neodontocryptus Uchida, 1940 — Oriental
  - Nippocryptus Uchida, 1936 — Oriental, Palearctic
  - Nothischnus Porter, 1967 — Neotropical (Porter, 1987)
  - Odontocryptus Saussure, 1892 — Ethiopian
  - Oecetiplex Porter, 1987 — Neotropica
  - Palmerella Cameron, 1908 — Oriental, Palearctic
  - Periplasma Porter, 1967 — Neotropical (Porter, 1987)
  - Phycitiplex Porter, 1987 — Neotropical
  - Picrocryptoides Porter, 1965 — Neotropical
  - Reptatrix Townes, 1962 — Nearctic
  - Rhynchocryptus Cameron, 1905 — Ethiopian (Townes & Townes, 1973)
  - Sciocryptus Porter, 1987 — Neotropical
  - Synechocryptus Schmiedeknecht, 1904 — Ethiopian, Palearctic
  - Trachysphyrus Haliday, 1836 — Neotropical
  - Tricentrum Townes, 1970a — Neotropical
  - Trihapsis Townes, 1970a — Neotropical
  - Xiphonychidion Porter, 1967 — Neotropical (Porter, 1987)
  - Xylacis Porter, 1987 — Neotropical
  - Xylophrurus Förster, 1869 — Holarctic
  - Xylostenus Gauld, 1984 — Australian
  - Zonocryptus Ashmead, 1900 — Ethiopian
- Subtribe Gabuniina

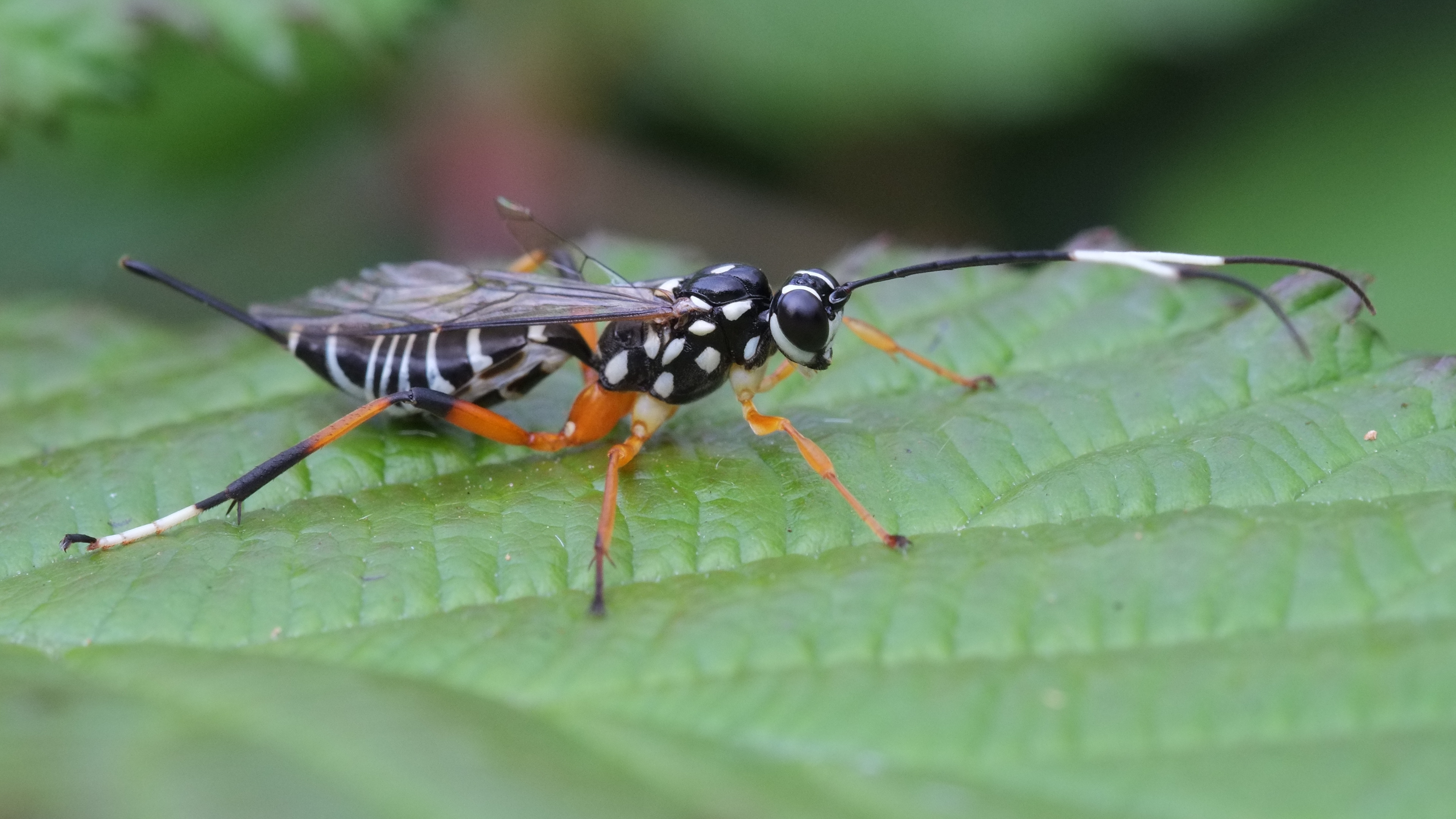
Xanthocryptus novozealandicus, female

  - Agonocryptus Cushman, 1929 — Nearctic, Neotropical
  - Ahilya Gupta & Gupta, 1985 — Oriental
  - Amrapalia Gupta & Jonathan, 1970 — Oriental
  - Anepomias Seyrig, 1952 — Ethiopian
  - Apocryptus Uchida, 1932 — Oriental
  - Arhytis Townes, 1970a — Australian, Oriental
  - Cestrus Townes, 1966 — Neotropical
  - Cryptohelcostizus Cushman, 1919 — Nearctic
  - Dagathia Cameron, 1903 — Oriental
  - Digonocryptus Viereck, 1913 — Neotropical
  - Eurycryptus Cameron, 1901 — Australian, Ethiopian, Oriental
  - Fenixia Aguiar, 2005 — Neotropical
  - Fortipalpa Kasparyan & Ruiz, 2007 — Neotropical
  - Gabunia Kriechbaumer, 1895 — Ethiopian
  - Gerdius Townes, 1970a — Ethiopian
  - Hackerocryptus Gauld, 1984 — Australian
  - Hadrocryptus Cameron, 1903 — Oriental
  - Kemalia Koçak, 2009 — Oriental
  - Kriegeria Ashmead, 1905 — Oriental (Gupta, 1987)
  - Lagarosoma Gupta & Gupta, 1984 — Neotropical
  - Lophoglutus Gauld, 1984 — Australian
  - Microstenus Szépligeti, 1916 — Oriental
  - Nesolinoceras Ashmead, 1906 — Neotropical
  - Pharzites Cameron, 1905 — Oriental
  - Prosthoporus Porter, 1976 — Neotropical
  - Pterocryptus Szépligeti, 1916 — Ethiopian, Palearctic
  - Schreineria Schreiner, 1905 — Ethiopian, Oriental, Palearctic
  - Spathacantha Townes, 1970a — Ethiopian
  - Tanepomidos Gupta & Jonathan, 1971 — Oriental
  - Torbda Cameron, 1902 — Oriental
  - Trypha Townes, 1970a — Neotropical
  - Xanthocryptus Cameron, 1901 — Australian, Oriental
  - Xoridesopus Cameron, 1907 — Oriental
- Subtribe Glodianina
  - Dicamixus Szépligeti, 1916 — Neotropical
  - Glodianus Cameron, 1902 — Neotropical
  - Lamprocryptus Schmiedeknecht, 1904 — Neotropical
- Subtribe Goryphina
  - Allophatnus Cameron, 1905 — Australian, Ethiopian, Oriental (Townes, 1971)
  - Baltazaria Townes, 1961b — Neotropical, Oriental
  - Bozakites Seyrig, 1952 — Ethiopian
  - Buodias Cameron, 1902 — Ethiopian, Oriental (Gupta, 1987)
  - Hoeocryptus Habermehl, 1902
  - Takastenus Uchida, 1931 (Gauld, 1984 — Gupta, 1987)
  - Soratsia Seyrig, 1952 (Townes & Townes, 1973)
  - Ceratella Seyrig, 1952
  - Calosphyrum Townes, 1970a — Oriental
  - Ceratophenax Seyrig, 1952 — Ethiopian
  - Colaulus Townes, 1970a — Oriental
  - Costifrons Townes, 1970a — Ethiopian
  - Debilos Townes, 1966 — Neotropical
  - Diapetimorpha Viereck, 1913 — Nearctic, Neotropical
  - Euchalinus Townes, 1961b — Australian, Oriental
  - Formostenus Uchida, 1931 (Jonathan, 1980) — Oriental
  - Fotsiforia Seyrig, 1952 — Ethiopian, Oriental (Jonathan, 1980)
  - Friona Cameron, 1902 — Oriental
  - Gambroides Betrem, 1941 — Australian, Ethiopian, Oriental (Jonathan, 1980)
  - Goryphus Holmgren, 1868 — Australian, Ethiopian, Oriental
  - Hemisphragia Seyrig, 1952 — Ethiopian
  - Hoeocryptus Habermehl, 1902 — Ethiopian
  - Hylophasma Townes, 1970a — Holarctic, Neotropical
  - Isotima Förster, 1869 — Oriental, Ethiopian
  - Larpelites Cameron, 1904 — Ethiopian
  - Lavinifia Seyrig, 1952 — Ethiopian
  - Listrognathus Tschek, 1870 — Australian, Ethiopian, Holarctic, Oriental
  - Loxopus Townes, 1970a — Neotropical
  - Madagascesa Kocak & Kemal, 2008 - formerly Perinetia Seyrig, 1952 — Ethiopian
  - Madastenus Seyrig, 1952 — Ethiopian
  - Melcha Cameron, 1902 — Oriental
  - Menaforia Seyrig, 1952 — Ethiopian, Oriental
  - Necolio Cheesman, 1936 — Australian, Ethiopian, Oriental, Palearctic
  - Neobuodias Rao & Nikam, 1984 — Oriental
  - Owenus Townes, 1970a — Ethiopian
  - Perjiva Jonathan & Gupta, 1973 — Oriental
  - Piambia Seyrig, 1952 — Ethiopian
  - Pseudotricapus Jonathan, 1987 — Oriental
  - Skeatia Cameron, 1901 — Ethiopian, Oriental (Jonathan & Gupta, 1973)
  - Syntrips Gauld, 1984 — Australian
  - Tanyloncha Townes, 1970a — Ethiopian
  - Tolonus Seyrig, 1952 — Ethiopian
  - Trafana Seyrig, 1952 — Ethiopian
  - Tricapus Townes, 1970a — Ethiopian
  - Tsirambia Seyrig, 1952 — Ethiopian
- Subtribe Lymeonina

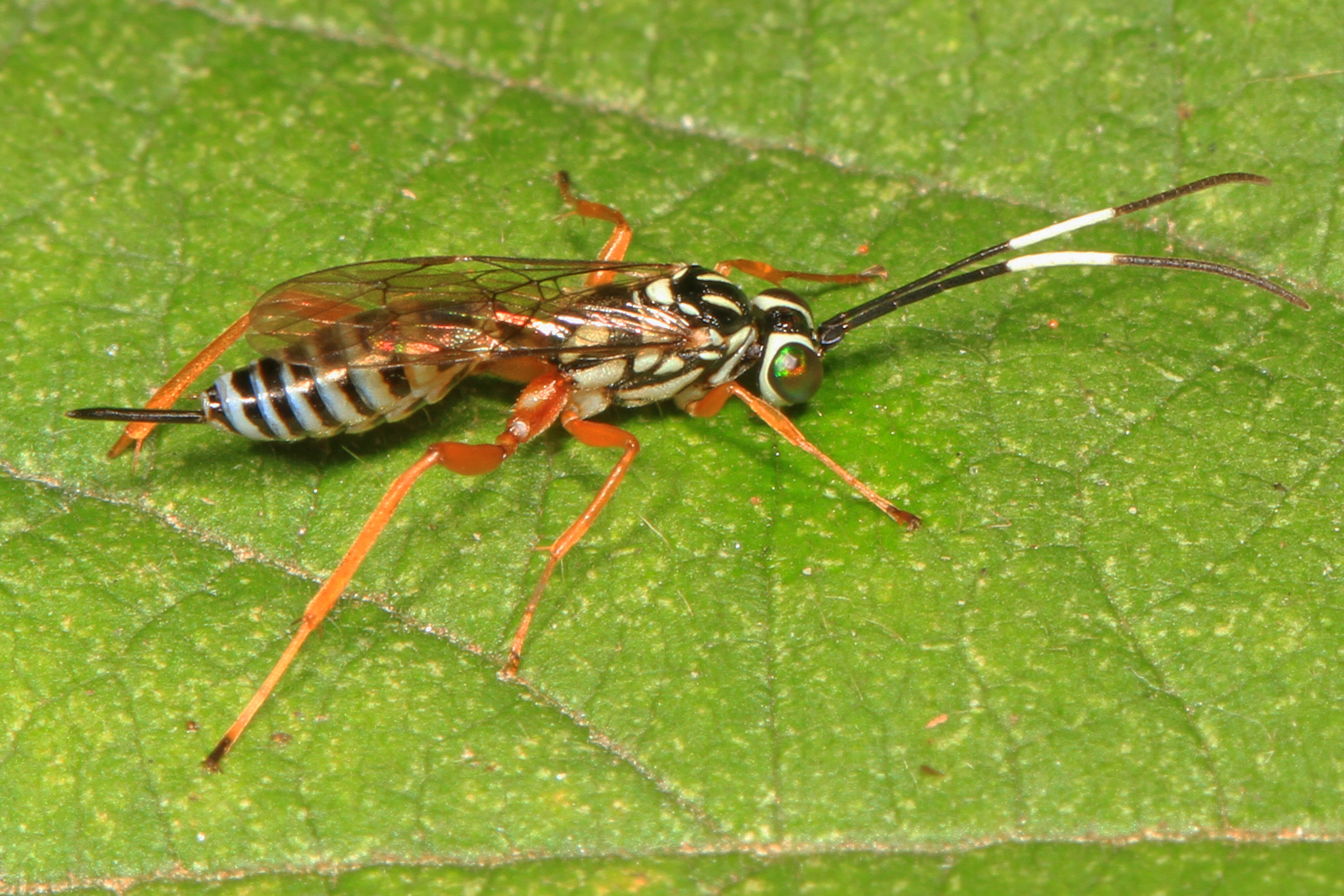
Lymeon orbus, female

  - Acerastes Cushman, 1929 — Nearctic, Neotropical
  - Basileucus Townes, 1970a — Neotropical
  - Bathyzonus Townes, 1970a — Neotropical
  - Bicryptella Strand, 1917 — Neotropical
  - Dismodix Townes, 1966 — Neotropical
  - Golbachiella Townes, 1970a — Neotropical
  - Latosculum Townes, 1966 — Neotropical
  - Lymeon Förster, 1869 — Nearctic, Neotropical
  - Mallochia Viereck, 1912 — Nearctic, Neotropical
  - Pachysomoides Strand, 1917 — Nearctic, Neotropical
  - Petila Tedesco & Aguiar, 2009 — Neotropic
  - Polycyrtidea Viereck, 1913 — Nearctic, Neotropical
  - Polyphrix Townes, 1970a — Neotropical
  - Priotomis Townes, 1970a — Neotropical
  - Rhinium Townes, 1966 — Neotropical
  - Savolia Seyrig, 1952 — Ethiopian
  - Strabotes Townes, 1970a — Neotropical
  - Toechorychus Townes, 1946 — Neotropical
- Subtribe Melanocryptina
  - Melanocryptus Cameron, 1902 — Neotropical
- Subtribe Mesostenina

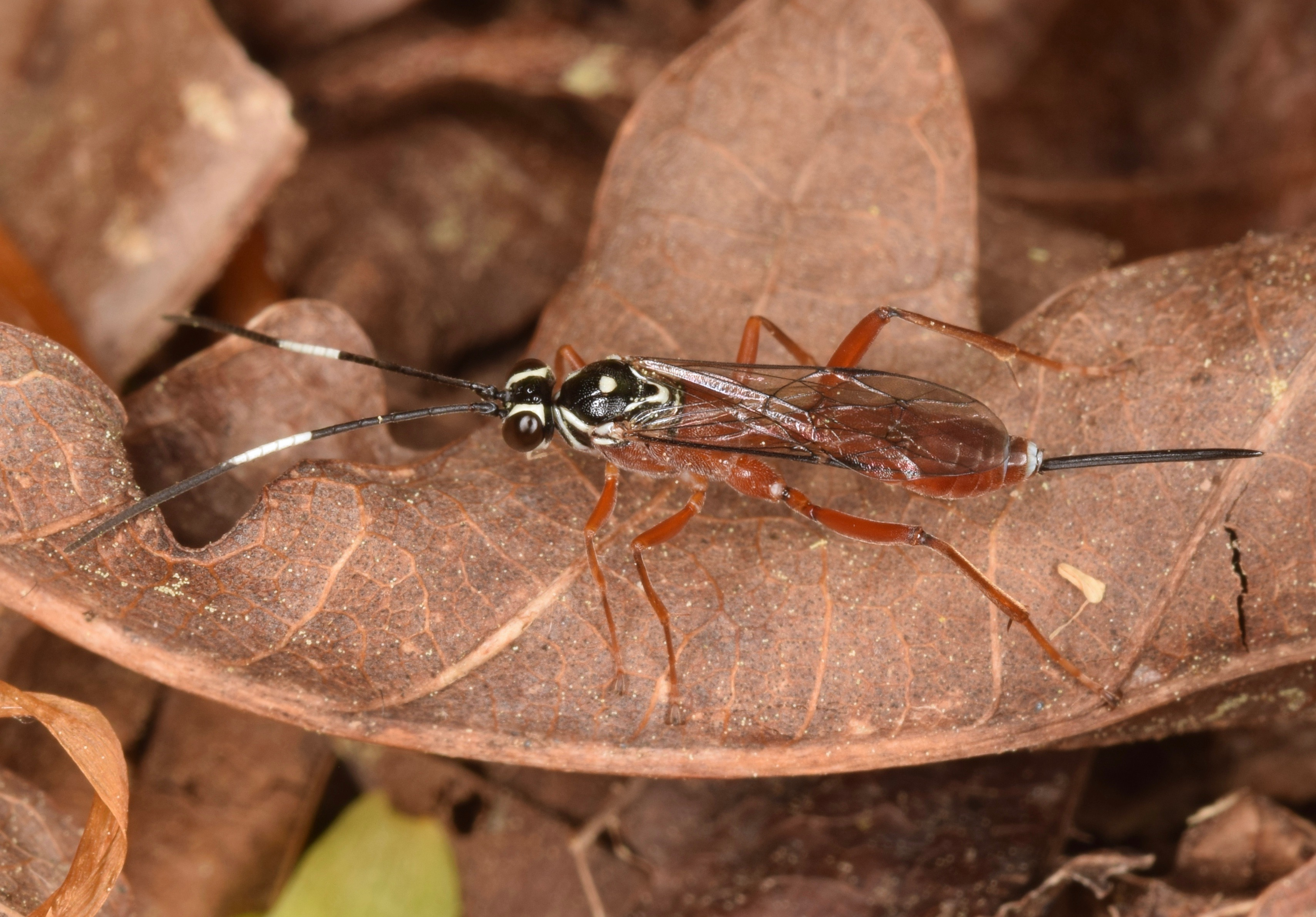
Mesostenus thoracicus, female

  - Acorystus Townes, 1970a — Neotropical
  - Anacis Porter, 1967 — Australian, Neotropical
  - Anupama Jonathan, 1982 — Oriental
  - Bicristella Townes, 1966 — Neotropical
  - Cryptanura Brullé, 1846 — Nearctic, Neotropical
  - Diloa Cheesman, 1936 — Australian, Oriental
  - Gotra Cameron, 1902 — Ethiopian, Oriental
  - Gyrolaba Townes, 1970a — Oriental
  - Harpura Townes, 1970a — Neotropical
  - Hercana Townes, 1970a — Neotropical
  - Irabatha Cameron, 1906 — Australian, Oriental
  - Junctivena Gauld, 1984 — Australian
  - Mecistum Townes, 1970a — Neotropical
  - Mesostenus Gravenhorst, 1829 — worldwide
  - Paranacis Gauld, 1984 — Australian
  - Polycyrtus Spinola, 1840 — Nearctic, Neotropical
  - Stiromesostenus Cameron, 1911 — Australian, Oriental
  - Tomagotras Gauld, 1984 — Australian
  - Tretobasis Porter, 1973 — Neotropical
- Subtribe Osprynchotina
  - Acroricnus Ratzeburg, 1852 — Holarctic
  - Iaria Cheesman, 1936 — Australian, Oriental
  - Messataporus Cushman, 1929 — Nearctic, Neotropical
  - Nematopodius Gravenhorst, 1829 — Oriental, Palearctic
  - Osprynchotus Spinola, 1841 — Ethiopian
  - Photocryptus Viereck, 1913 — Neotropical
  - Poecilopimpla Morley, 1914;
  - Picardiella Lichtenstein, 1920 — Ethiopian, Oriental, Palearctic
  - Sphecoctonus Seyrig, 1952 — Ethiopian
  - Stenarella Szépligeti, 1916 — Australian, Ethiopian, Oriental
- Subtribe Sphecophagina
  - Arthula Cameron, 1900 — Australian, Oriental, Palearctic
  - Latibulus Gistel, 1848 — Oriental, Palearctic
  - Sphecophaga Westwood, 1840 — Holarctic
- Subtribe Vagenathina
  - Stetholophus Townes, 1970a — Oriental
  - Vagenatha Cameron, 1901 — Oriental

=== Tribe Aptesini ===
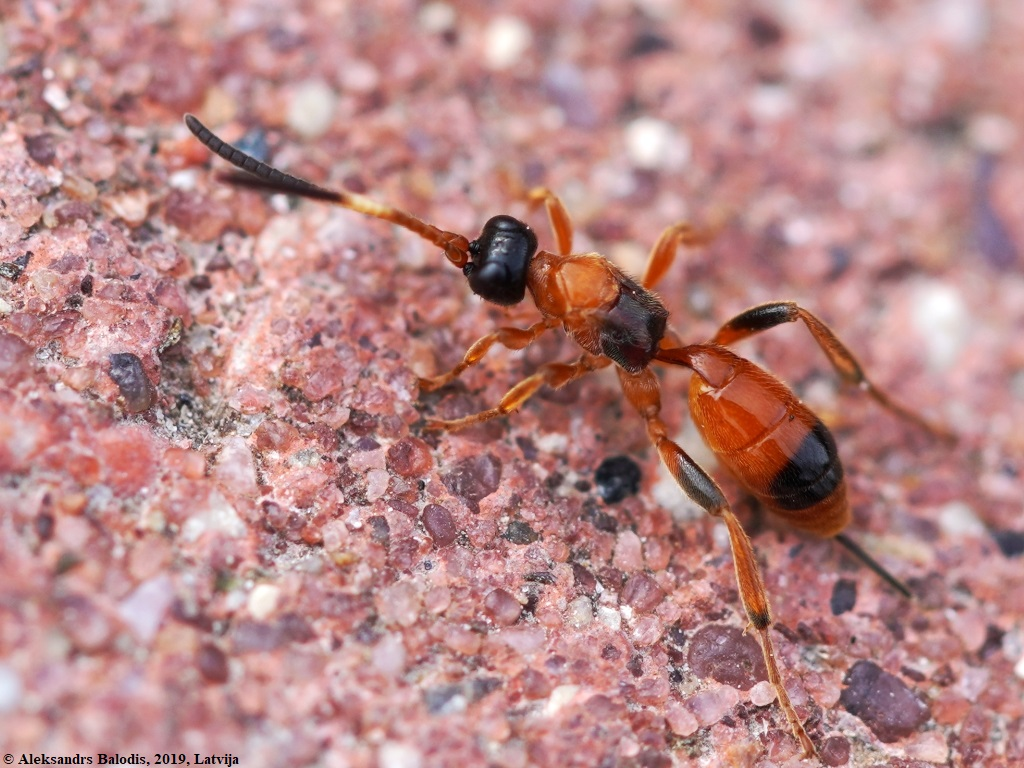
Aptesis nigrocincta, female

- Aconias Cameron, 1904 — Palearctic, Oriental
- Aptesis Förster, 1850 — Ethiopian, Holarctic, Oriental
- Colocnema Förster, 1869 — Palearctic
- Cratocryptus Thomson, 1873 — Holarctic
- Cubocephalus Ratzeburg, 1848 — Holarctic
- Demopheles Förster, 1869 — Holarctic, Oriental
- Echthrus Gravenhorst, 1829 — Holarctic
- Giraudia Förster, 1869 — Holarctic
- Hemigaster Brullé, 1846 — Oriental
- Javra Cameron, 1903 — Holarctic, Oriental
- Listrocryptus Brauns, 1905 — Palearctic
- Litochila Momoi, 1965 — Oriental, Palearctic
- Livipurpurata Wang & Yao, 1994 — Oriental
- Mansa Tosquinet, 1896 — Ethiopian, Oriental
- Megaplectes Förster, 1869 — Holarctic
- Notocampsis Townes, 1970a — Neotropical
- Oresbius Marshall, 1867 — Holarctic
- Oxytaenia Förster, 1869 — Nearctic, Neotropical
- Parmortha Townes, 1962 — Holarctic
- Platymystax Townes, 1970a — Ethiopian, Neotropical, Oriental
- Plectrocryptus Thomson, 1874 — Oriental, Palearctic
- Pleolophus Townes, 1962 — Holarctic
- Polytribax Förster, 1869 — Holarctic, Neotropical, Oriental
- Rhytura Townes, 1962 — Nearctic
- Schenkia Förster, 1869 — Holarctic
- Stomacis Townes, 1970a — Oriental
