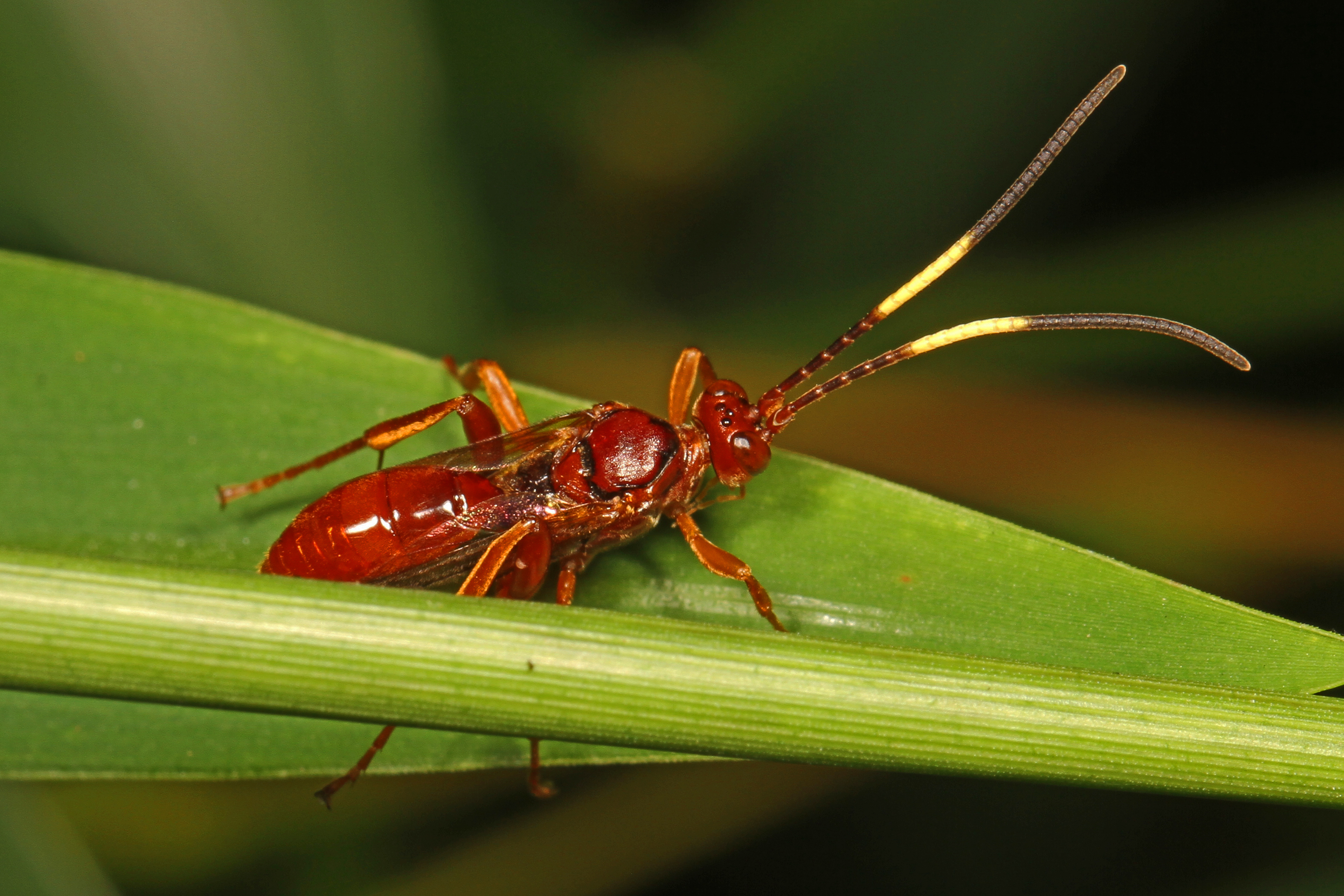
- Polytribax pallescens

Scientific classification
- Kingdom: Animalia
- Phylum: Arthropoda
- Class: Insecta
- Order: Hymenoptera
- Family: Ichneumonidae
- Subfamily: Cryptinae
- Tribe: Aptesini; Smith & Shenefelt 1955

Synonyms
- Echthrini (in part); Hemigastrini (in part)

= Aptesini =

Tribe of wasps

Aptesini is a tribe of ichneumon wasps in the family Ichneumonidae. There are 24 described genera.

== Genera ==
The following genera belong to the tribe Aptesini:

- Aconias Cameron, 1904 — Palearctic, Oriental
- Aptesis Förster, 1850 — Ethiopian, Holarctic, Oriental
- Colocnema Förster, 1869 — Palearctic
- Cratocryptus Thomson, 1873 — Holarctic
- Cubocephalus Ratzeburg, 1848 — Holarctic
- Demopheles Förster, 1869 — Holarctic, Oriental
- Giraudia Förster, 1869 — Holarctic
- Javra Cameron, 1903 — Holarctic, Oriental
- Listrocryptus Brauns, 1905 — Palearctic
- Litochila Momoi, 1965 — Oriental, Palearctic
- Livipurpurata Wang & Yao, 1994 — Oriental
- Mansa Tosquinet, 1896 — Ethiopian, Oriental
- Megaplectes Förster, 1869 — Holarctic
- Notocampsis Townes, 1970a — Neotropical
- Oresbius Marshall, 1867 — Holarctic
- Oxytaenia Förster, 1869 — Nearctic, Neotropical
- Parmortha Townes, 1962 — Holarctic
- Platymystax Townes, 1970a — Ethiopian, Neotropical, Oriental
- Plectrocryptus Thomson, 1874 — Oriental, Palearctic
- Pleolophus Townes, 1962 — Holarctic
- Polytribax Förster, 1869 — Holarctic, Neotropical, Oriental
- Rhytura Townes, 1962 — Nearctic
- Schenkia Förster, 1869 — Holarctic
- Stomacis Townes, 1970a — Oriental
