= Cryptaulax =

Cryptaulax may refer to:

- Cryptaulaxella, a genus of flagellates in the family Neobodonidae previously known as Cryptaulax Skuja, 1939
- †Cryptaulax (gastropod), (†Cryptaulax Tate, 1869), the type genus of the subfamily Cryptaulacinae, when considered valid, otherwise an extinct genus in the family Procerithiidae and subfamily Procerithiinae
- Cryptaulax (wasp) (Cryptaulax Camoron, 1906), a genus of wasps in the subfamily Gelinae
