= Wuda =

Wuda may refer to:

- Wuda District, Wuhai, China
- Wuda (wasp)
- Wuhan University, abbreviated as Wuda in Chinese
- Wuda Railway, a section of Wuhan–Jiujiang Railway
- Wuda, a village in Meichuan, Wuxue, Huanggang, Hubei
