= Latibulus =

Scientific classification
- Kingdom: Animalia
- Phylum: Arthropoda
- Class: Insecta
- Order: Hymenoptera
- Family: Ichneumonidae
- Subfamily: Cryptinae
- Tribe: Cryptini
- Subtribe: Sphecophagina
- Genus: Latibulus; Gistel, 1848

Genus of wasps

Latibulus is a genus of wasps in the family Ichneumonidae. There are two species in Europe:

- Latibulus argiolus (Rossi, 1790)
- Latibulus lautus (Tosquinet, 1896)

== Biology ==
Latibulus argiolus is a parasitoid which lies in wait in the near proximity of a Polistes paper wasp nest waiting for an opportunity for penetration and then, within a few seconds, lays an egg into a nest cell. The biology of the larva is unknown. There are two generations per year. The first emerges in the summer after pupation takes place in a yellowish cocoon within the cell; the second generation winters in a brown, resistant cocoon. The pupa of the second generation is able to break through the cell cover by making jerky movements. The pupa falls to the ground, looks for a recess by making rolling movements, and winters there.
