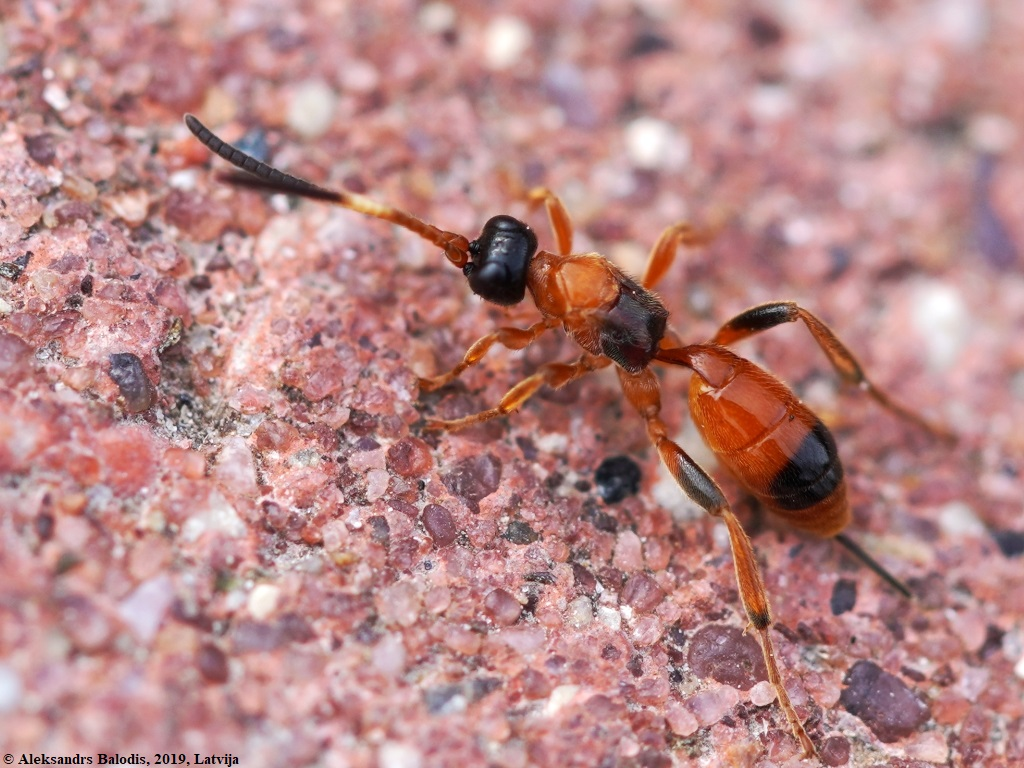
- Aptesis nigrocincta

Scientific classification
- Domain: Eukaryota
- Kingdom: Animalia
- Phylum: Arthropoda
- Class: Insecta
- Order: Hymenoptera
- Family: Ichneumonidae
- Subfamily: Cryptinae
- Tribe: Aptesini
- Genus: Aptesis; Förster, 1850

= Aptesis =

Genus of wasps

Aptesis is a genus of parasitoid wasps belonging to the family Ichneumonidae. The genus was first described by Arnold Förster in 1850 and has almost cosmopolitan distribution.

== Select species ==
About 74 species are described:

- Aptesis acuminata (Kriechbaumer, 1899)
- Aptesis albibasalis (Uchida, 1930)
- Aptesis albidipes (Walker, 1874)
- Aptesis albifrons Townes, 1962
- Aptesis alpestris Townes, 1962
- Aptesis alpicola (Habermehl, 1935)
- Aptesis alpineti (Roman, 1913)
- Aptesis anaulus Townes, 1962
- Aptesis assimilis (Gravenhorst, 1829)
- Aptesis atrox Townes, 1962
- Aptesis breviaria Townes, 1962
- Aptesis catulus Townes, 1962
- Aptesis chosensis (Uchida, 1931)
- Aptesis concolor Ruthe, 1859
- Aptesis contigua (Roman, 1909)
- Aptesis corniculata Sheng, 2003
- Aptesis cretata (Gravenhorst, 1829)
- Aptesis elongata Li & Sheng, 2013
- Aptesis erratica (Holmgren, 1869)
- Aptesis exannulata (Strobl, 1901)
- Aptesis exquisita (Schmiedeknecht, 1905)
- Aptesis fastigata Townes, 1962
- Aptesis femoralis (Thomson, 1883)
- Aptesis flagitator (Rossi, 1794)
- Aptesis flavifaciator Aubert, 1968
- Aptesis flavitrochanterus Watanabe & Taniwaki, 2018
- Aptesis fuscitibia Townes, 1962
- Aptesis gracilis Townes, 1962
- Aptesis grandis Sheng, 1998
- Aptesis gravipes (Gravenhorst, 1829)
- Aptesis habermehli Sawoniewicz, 2003
- Aptesis hannibal (Smits van Burgst, 1913)
- Aptesis hypocrita (Cameron, 1897)
- Aptesis improba (Gravenhorst, 1829)
- Aptesis incompta Townes, 1962
- Aptesis inculta Townes, 1962
- Aptesis jejunator (Gravenhorst, 1807)
- Aptesis latiannulata (Cameron, 1904)
- Aptesis leucotarsus (Gravenhorst, 1829)
- Aptesis lissopleuris Townes, 1962
- Aptesis melana Li & Sheng, 2013
- Aptesis messor Jonaitis, 1981
- Aptesis minutor Aubert, 1968
- Aptesis nigricollis (Thomson, 1883)
- Aptesis nigricoxa Li & Sheng, 2013
- Aptesis nigritula (Thomson, 1885)
- Aptesis nigrocincta (Gravenhorst, 1815)
- Aptesis nordlandiae (Strand, 1913)
- Aptesis ochrostoma (Thomson, 1897)
- Aptesis opaca (Cushman, 1937)
- Aptesis opposita (Kriechbaumer, 1902)
- Aptesis orbitalis (Thomson, 1883)
- Aptesis pallidinervis (Cameron, 1904)
- Aptesis pectoralis (Thomson, 1888)
- Aptesis perversa (Kriechbaumer, 1893)
- Aptesis plana (Kriechbaumer, 1893)
- Aptesis polita Bauer, 1985
- Aptesis pugnax (Hartig, 1838)
- Aptesis pulchripes (Cameron, 1903)
- Aptesis punjabensis (Gupta, 1955)
- Aptesis rufifemur (Kiss, 1924)
- Aptesis rufigastra (Tosquinet, 1896)
- Aptesis scabra Townes, 1962
- Aptesis scotica (Marshall, 1868)
- Aptesis scutellator Aubert, 1968
- Aptesis segnis (Provancher, 1877)
- Aptesis senicula (Kriechbaumer, 1893)
- Aptesis silvatica (Habermehl, 1935)
- Aptesis subguttata (Gravenhorst, 1829)
- Aptesis subnigrocinctus Jonaitis, 1981
- Aptesis terminata (Gravenhorst, 1829)
- Aptesis varia (Pfankuch, 1921)
- Aptesis verrucata Townes, 1962
- Aptesis yosemite Townes, 1962
