= Ahilya (wasp) =

Scientific classification
- Kingdom: Animalia
- Phylum: Arthropoda
- Class: Insecta
- Order: Hymenoptera
- Family: Ichneumonidae
- Subfamily: Cryptinae
- Genus: Ahilya; Gupta & Gupta, 1985

Species
- 4 species (see text)

Genus of wasps

Ahilya is a genus of ichneumonid wasps in the subfamily Cryptinae, tribe Cryptini. Species have an Oriental distribution.

== Species ==
There are four recognized species:

- Ahilya bicornigera Gupta & Gupta 1983
- Ahilya ferruginea Gupta & Gupta, 1983
- Ahilya simillima Gupta & Gupta, 1983
- Ahilya townesorum Gupta & Gupta, 1983
