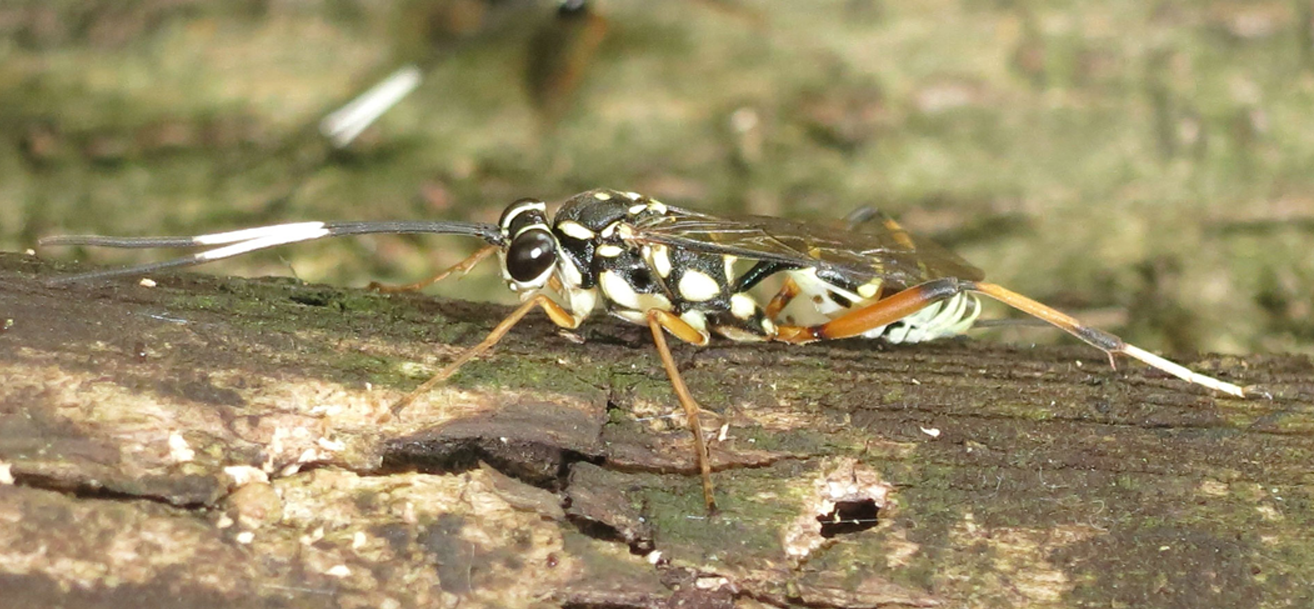
- Gotra octocincta

Scientific classification
- Kingdom: Animalia
- Phylum: Arthropoda
- Class: Insecta
- Order: Hymenoptera
- Family: Ichneumonidae
- Subfamily: Cryptinae
- Tribe: Cryptini
- Subtribe: Mesostenina
- Genus: Gotra; Cameron, 1902

Type species
- Gotra longicornis Cameron, 1902

Synonyms
- Stenaraeoides Uchida, 1932; Ivondrites Seyrig, 1952

= Gotra (wasp) =

Genus of wasps

Gotra is a genus of ichneumonid wasps in the subfamily Cryptinae. There are at least 40 described species in Gotra.

== Description and identification ==
Gotra is distinguished from other genera in the subtribe Mesostenina by having apical margin of the clypeus evenly arched but without a median tooth.

== Distribution ==
Species in the genus are found in Northeast Asia, Indomalaya, Australasia, and Madagascar.

== Species ==
The following species are included in the genus:

- Gotra actuaria (Tosquinet, 1903)
- Gotra acutilineata (Cameron, 1905)
- Gotra albospinosa (Smith, 1859)
- Gotra annulipes (Cameron, 1906)
- Gotra anthracina (Tosquinet, 1903)
- Gotra bimaculata Cheesman, 1936
- Gotra carinifrons Cameron, 1903
- Gotra caveata Cheesman, 1936
- Gotra cyclosiae (Cameron, 1905)
- Gotra doddi Cheesman, 1936
- Gotra elegans Watanabe, 2020
- Gotra emaculata (Szepligeti, 1916)
- Gotra errabunda Cheesman, 1936
- Gotra erythropus (Cameron, 1905)
- Gotra eversor (Tosquinet, 1903)
- Gotra formosana (Szepligeti, 1916)
- Gotra fugator (Seyrig, 1952)
- Gotra fuscicoxis Cheesman, 1936
- Gotra gilberti (Turner, 1919)
- Gotra hapaliae (Rao, 1953)
- Gotra interrupta Kusigemati, 1986
- Gotra latispina (Cameron, 1907)
- Gotra literata (Brulle, 1846)
- Gotra longicornis Cameron, 1902
- Gotra luctuosa (Brulle, 1846)
- Gotra maculata (Szepligeti, 1908)
- Gotra marginata (Brulle, 1846)
- Gotra novoguineensis (Szepligeti, 1916)
- Gotra octocincta (Ashmead, 1906)
- Gotra ominosa (Tosquinet, 1903)
- Gotra philippinensis (Ashmead, 1904)
- Gotra pomonellae (Cameron, 1912)
- Gotra punctulata Cheesman, 1936
- Gotra ryukyuensis Kusigemati, 1986
- Gotra serendiva (Fernando, 1956)
- Gotra simulator (Tosquinet, 1903)
- Gotra stirocephala (Cameron, 1912)
- Gotra striatipleuris (Cameron, 1911)
- Gotra unicolor (Turner, 1919)
- Gotra varipes (Cameron, 1903)

== Gallery ==
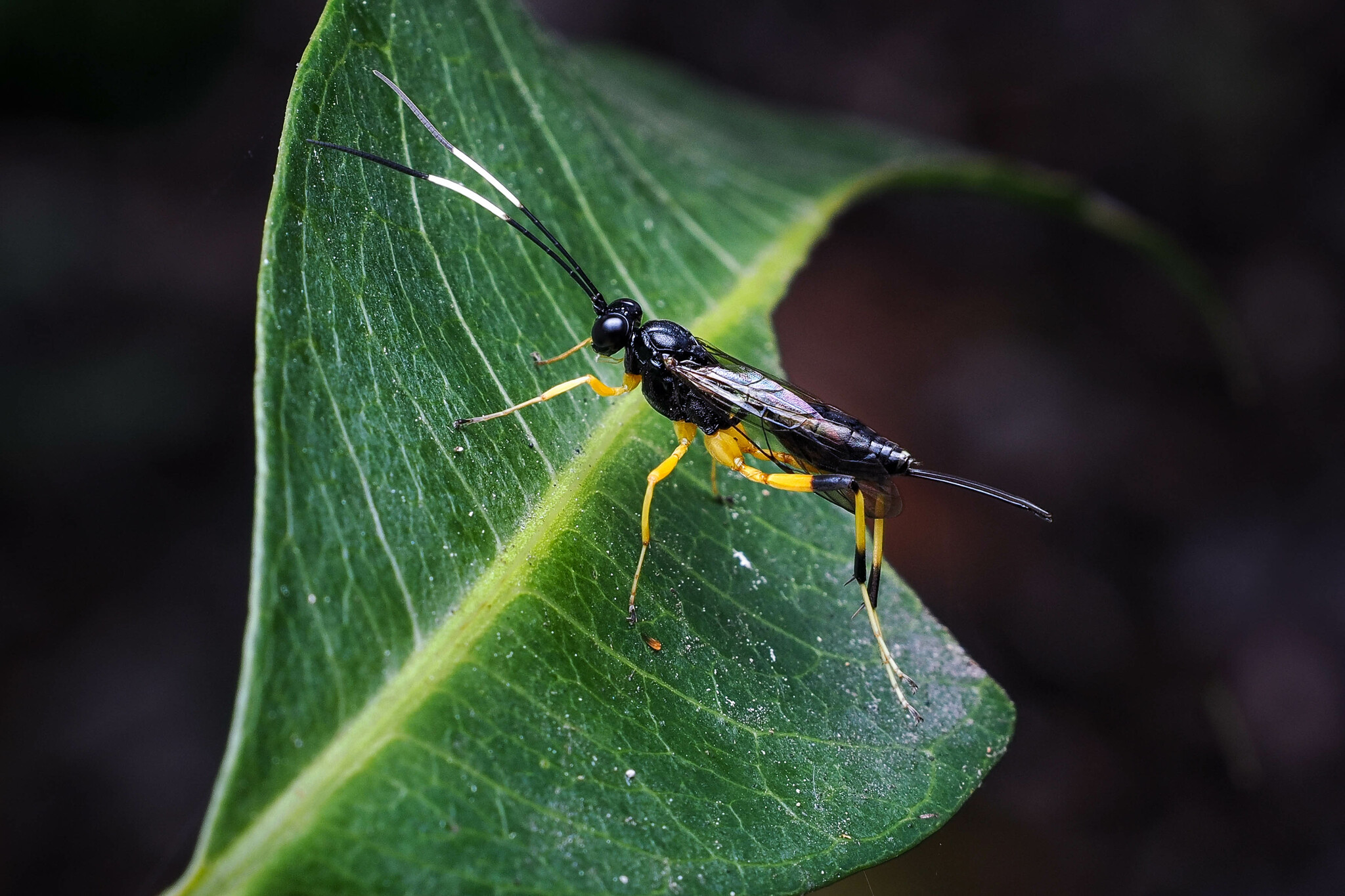
Gotra gilberti from Brisbane, Australia

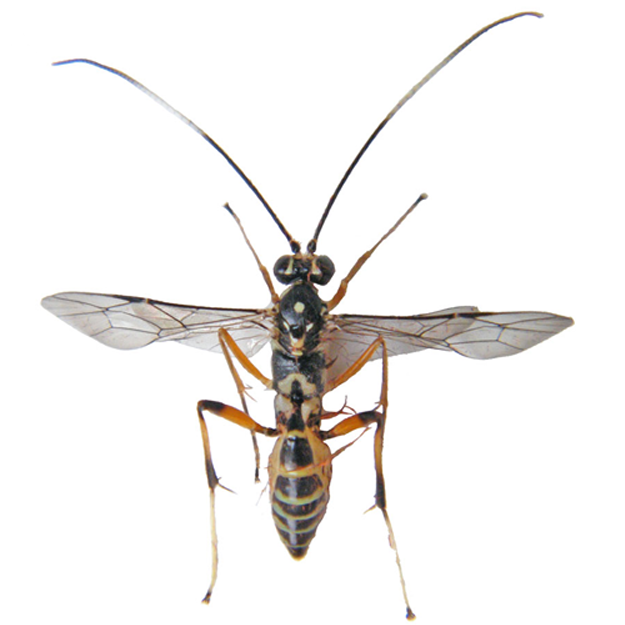
Gotra octocincta from Nanning, China
