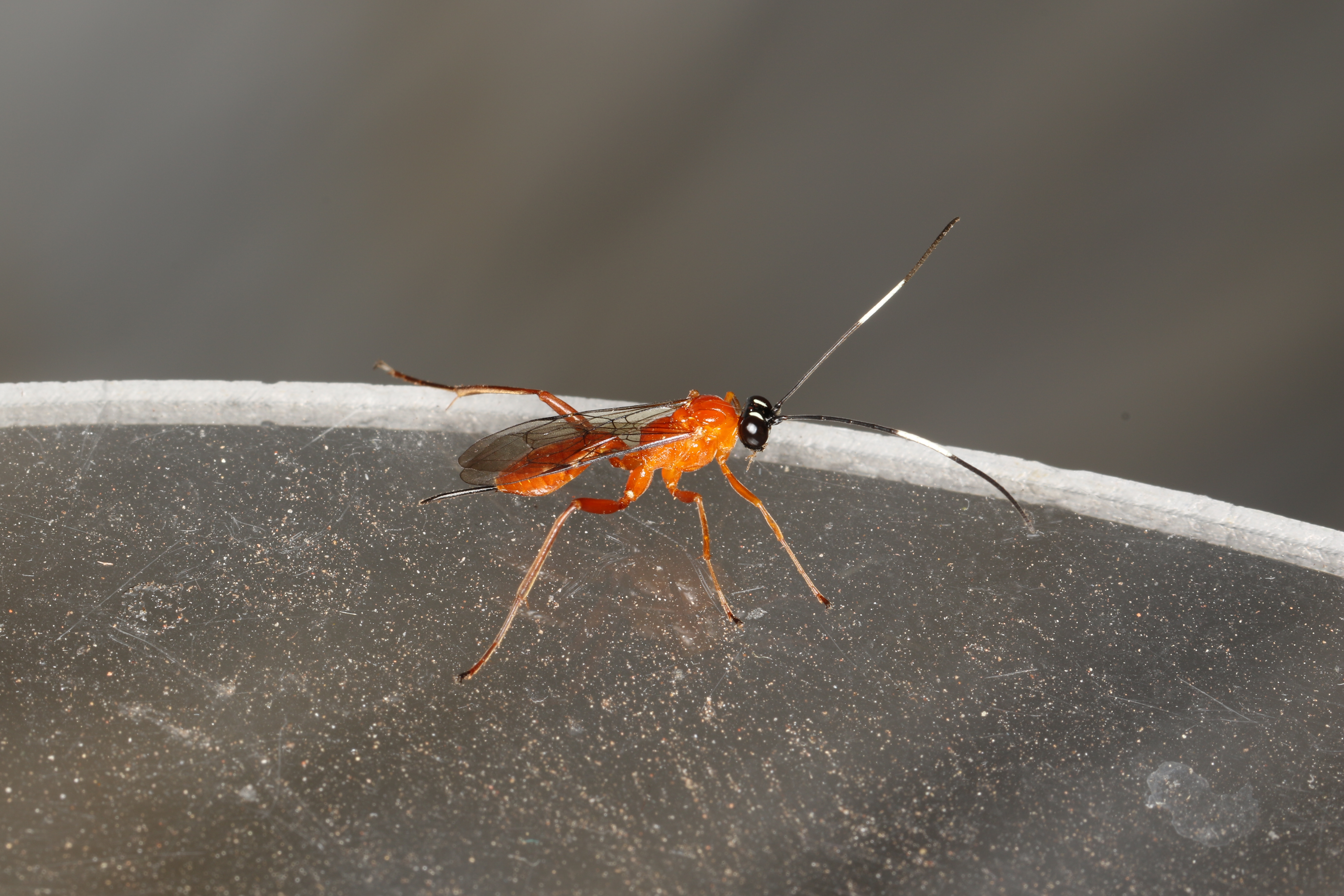
- Stiromesostenus sp., female

Scientific classification
- Domain: Eukaryota
- Kingdom: Animalia
- Phylum: Arthropoda
- Class: Insecta
- Order: Hymenoptera
- Family: Ichneumonidae
- Subfamily: Cryptinae
- Tribe: Cryptini
- Subtribe: Mesostenina
- Genus: Stiromesostenus; Cameron, 1911

= Stiromesostenus =

Genus of insects

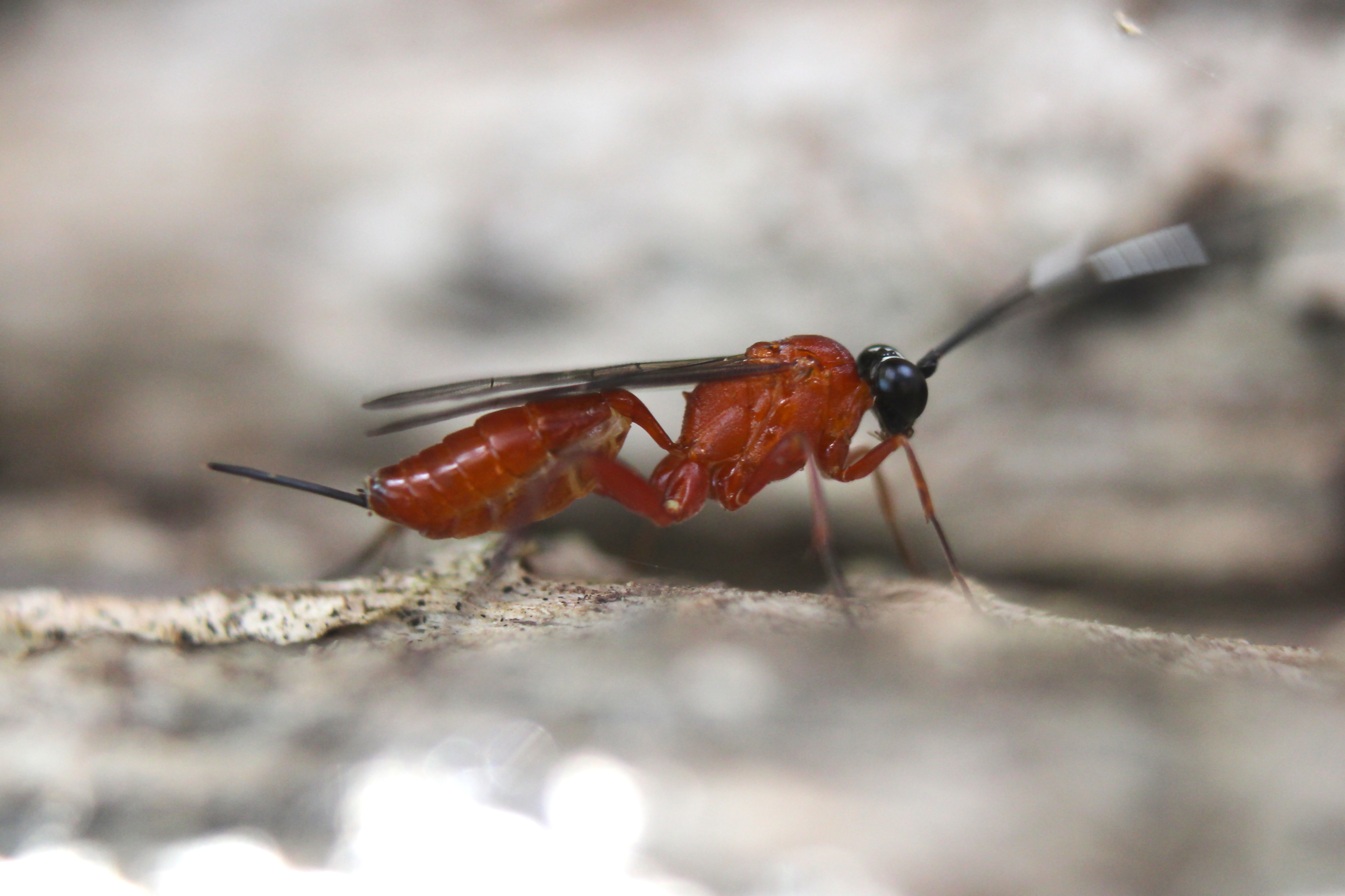
Stiromesostenus sp.

Stiromesostenus is an Australian genus of ichneumon wasps in the subfamily Cryptinae. There are two recognised species, S. albiorbitalis and S. rufus, and potentially seven undescribed species.

== Description ==
Stiromesostenus ranges from small to moderately large, with forewing length of 4-12 mm. Most species are reddish brown in colour and several have darkened wing apices. The antennae have white bands in the middle.

== Ecology ==
Wasps of this genus are parasitoids of Lepidoptera. Stiromesostenus rufus has been reared from an unspecified "fern moth" larva. Stiromesostenus albiorbitalis attacks the macadamia twig girdler, Xylorycta luteotactella (=Neodrepta luteotactella) (Xyloryctidae). An unspecified species of Stiromesostenus have been reared from Uraba lugens (Nolidae)
