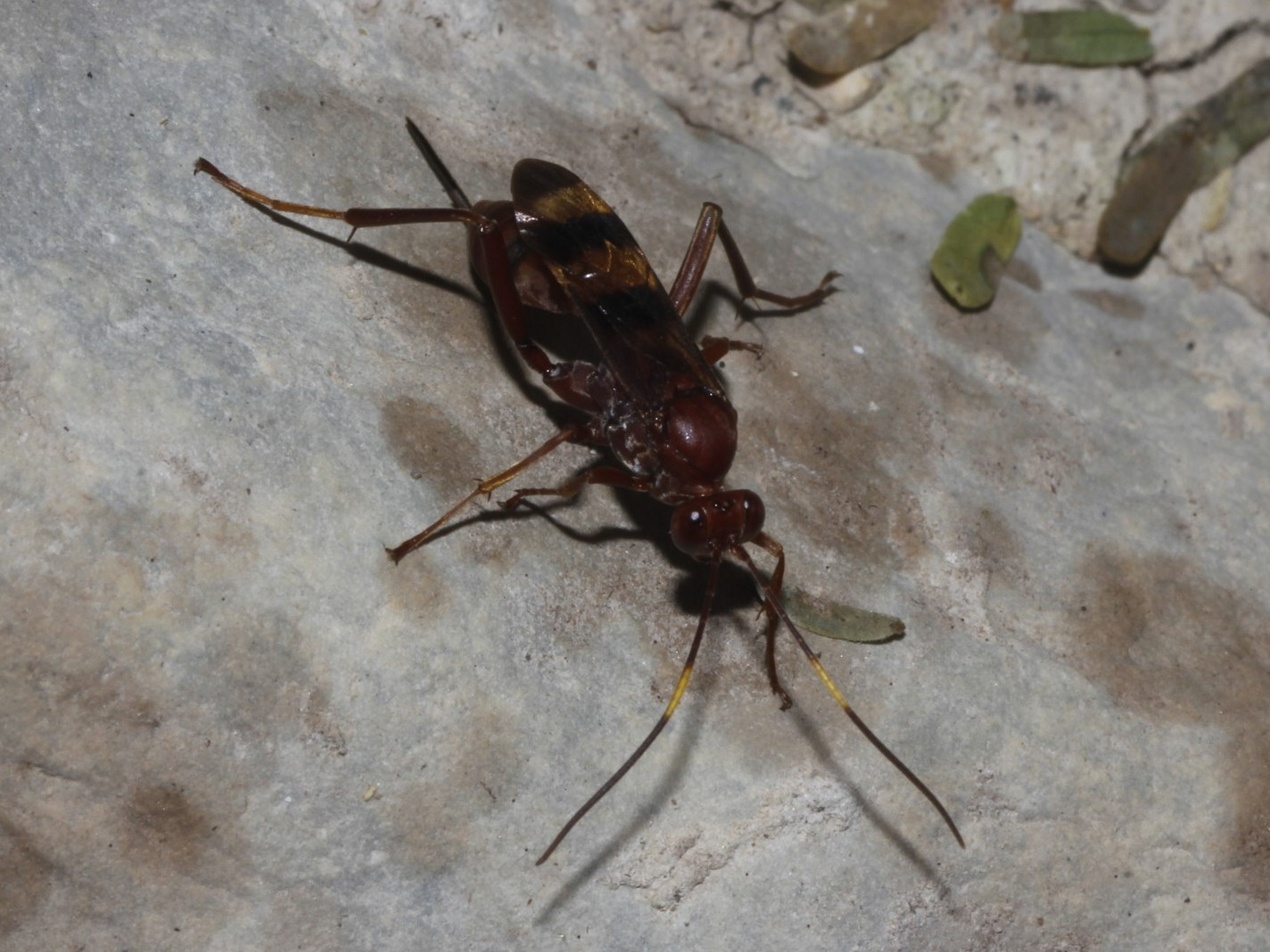
- Lanugo picta

Scientific classification
- Kingdom: Animalia
- Phylum: Arthropoda
- Clade: Pancrustacea
- Class: Insecta
- Order: Hymenoptera
- Family: Ichneumonidae
- Genus: Lanugo; Townes, 1962

= Lanugo (wasp) =

Genus of wasps

Lanugo is a genus of wasps belonging to the family Ichneumonidae. The name refers to the Latin word lanugo, meaning soft, downy hair, due to the hair found on species within this genus. This genus differs from the otherwise similar genus Compsocryptus by its "moderately short, straight ovipositor rather than a longer upcurved one, axillus vein closer to anal margin of hind wing, front size of areolet narrower."

== Species ==
Species within this genus include:

- Lanugo bicincta Townes, 1962
- Lanugo brunnipennis Townes, 1962
- Lanugo cesta (Say, 1863)
- Lanugo deserti Townes, 1962
- Lanugo excincta Townes, 1962
- Lanugo ferrugata Townes, 1962
- Lanugo flavipennis Townes, 1962
- Lanugo fraternans (Cameron, 1885)
- Lanugo hebetis (Cameron, 1885)
- Lanugo longuria Townes, 1962
- Lanugo picta Townes, 1962
- Lanugo polita Townes, 1962
- Lanugo retentor (Brullé, 1846)
- Lanugo schlingeri Townes, 1962
- Lanugo sororia (Cresson, 1872)
- Lanugo yucatan Kasparyan & Ruíz-Cancino, 2005
