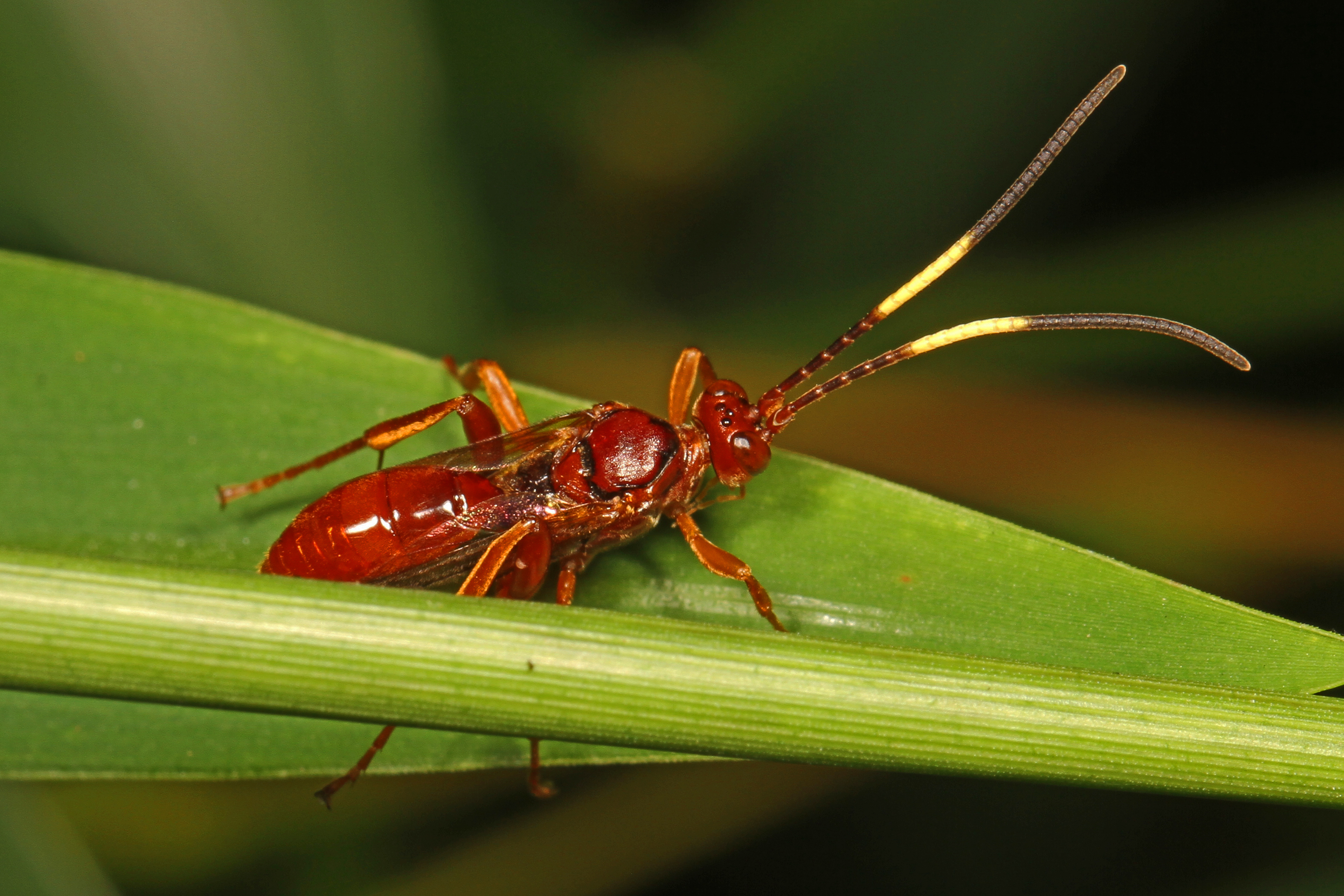

Scientific classification
- Kingdom: Animalia
- Phylum: Arthropoda
- Class: Insecta
- Order: Hymenoptera
- Family: Ichneumonidae
- Genus: Polytribax
- Species: P. pallescens

Binomial name
- Polytribax pallescens (Viereck, 1911)

= Polytribax pallescens =

Species of wasp

Polytribax pallescens is a species of ichneumon wasp in the family Ichneumonidae.
