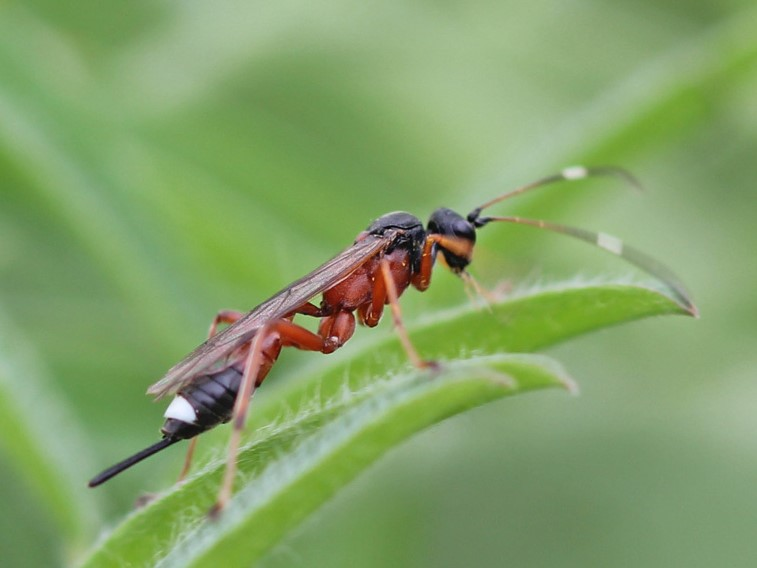
- Gambrus carnifex

Scientific classification
- Kingdom: Animalia
- Phylum: Arthropoda
- Class: Insecta
- Order: Hymenoptera
- Family: Ichneumonidae
- Subfamily: Cryptinae
- Tribe: Cryptini
- Subtribe: Agrothereutina
- Genus: Gambrus; Förster, 1868

= Gambrus =

Genus of wasps

Gambrus is a genus of wasps belonging to the family Ichneumonidae. The genus was first described by Förster in 1868 and has a cosmopolitan distribution.

== Species ==
- Gambrus amoenus Gravenhorst, 1829
- Gambrus antefurcalis (Constantineanu & Constantineanu, 1968)
- Gambrus aphrodite (Heinrich, 1949)
- Gambrus apicatus (Provancher, 1874)
- Gambrus biannulator (Constantineanu 1973)
- Gambrus bipunctatus (Tschek, 1872)
- Gambrus bituminosus (Cushman, 1924)
- Gambrus canadensis (Provancher, 1875)
- Gambrus carnifex (Gravenhorst, 1829)
- Gambrus conjungens (Tschek, 1871)
- Gambrus extrematis (Cresson, 1864)
- Gambrus incubitor Linnaeus, 1758
- Gambrus madronio Kasparyan & Ruiz-Cancino, 2005
- Gambrus ornatus (Gravenhorst, 1829)
- Gambrus polyphemi Förster 1868
- Gambrus ruficoxatus (Sonan, 1930)
- Gambrus rufithorax (Constantineanu & Constantineanu, 1968)
- Gambrus tricolor (Gravenhorst, 1829)
- Gambrus tunicularuber (Fyles, 1896)
- Gambrus ultimus (Cresson, 1864)
- Gambrus varians (Brischke, 1891)
- Gambrus variator (Walker, 1874)
- Gambrus wadai (Uchida, 1936)
- Gambrus wileyi Brambila, 1997
- Gambrus yukonensis Townes, 1962
