= Camera (wasp) =

Scientific classification
- Kingdom: Animalia
- Phylum: Arthropoda
- Class: Insecta
- Order: Hymenoptera
- Family: Ichneumonidae
- Subfamily: Cryptinae
- Tribe: Cryptini
- Subtribe: Cryptina
- Genus: Camera; Townes & Townes, 1962

Genus of wasp

Camera is a genus of wasp in the family Ichneumonidae. Members of the genus are parasitoids on the eggs of wall crab spiders (Selenopidae).
