= Coccygodes =

Scientific classification
- Kingdom: Animalia
- Phylum: Arthropoda
- Class: Insecta
- Order: Hymenoptera
- Family: Ichneumonidae
- Subfamily: Cryptinae
- Tribe: Cryptini
- Subtribe: Baryceratina
- Genus: Coccygodes; Saussure, 1892

Species
- See text

Synonyms
- Ateleonotus (Cameron, 1909); Cryptaulax Cameron, 1906

Genus of wasps

Coccygodes is a genus of wasps in the subfamily Cryptinae, tribe Cryptini and subtribe Baryceratina.

== Species ==
- Coccygodes alacer Tosquinet, 1896
- Coccygodes bifasciatus Cameron, 1912
- Coccygodes bimaculator (Thunberg, 1822)
- Coccygodes brevispiculus Waterston, 1927
- Coccygodes corpulentus Tosquinet, 1896
- Coccygodes eugeneus Tosquinet, 1896
- Coccygodes nobilis (Saussure, 1892)
- Coccygodes pictipennis Tosquinet, 1896
- Coccygodes rufopetiolatus Waterston, 1927
- Coccygodes subquadratus Waterston, 1927
- Coccygodes superbus Szépligeti, 1916
- Coccygodes townesorum De Santis, 1967

Names brought to synonymy

- Coccygodes erythrostomus, synonym of Coccygodes pictipennis
- Coccygodes nigrescens, synonym of Coccygodes bifasciatus
- Coccygodes notatus, synonym of Coccygodes superbus
- Coccygodes ruficeps, synonym of Coccygodes townesorum
- Coccygodes waterstoni, synonym of Coccygodes brevispiculus
