= Tolonus =

Scientific classification
- Domain: Eukaryota
- Kingdom: Animalia
- Phylum: Arthropoda
- Class: Insecta
- Order: Hymenoptera
- Family: Ichneumonidae
- Subfamily: Cryptinae
- Tribe: Cryptini
- Subtribe: Goryphina
- Genus: Tolonus; Seyrig, 1952

Synonyms
- Mavia Seyrig, 1952; Hegemonites Seyrig, 1952; Mascarella Seyrig, 1952

Genus of wasps

Tolonus is a genus of ichneumon wasps in the subfamily Cryptinae.
