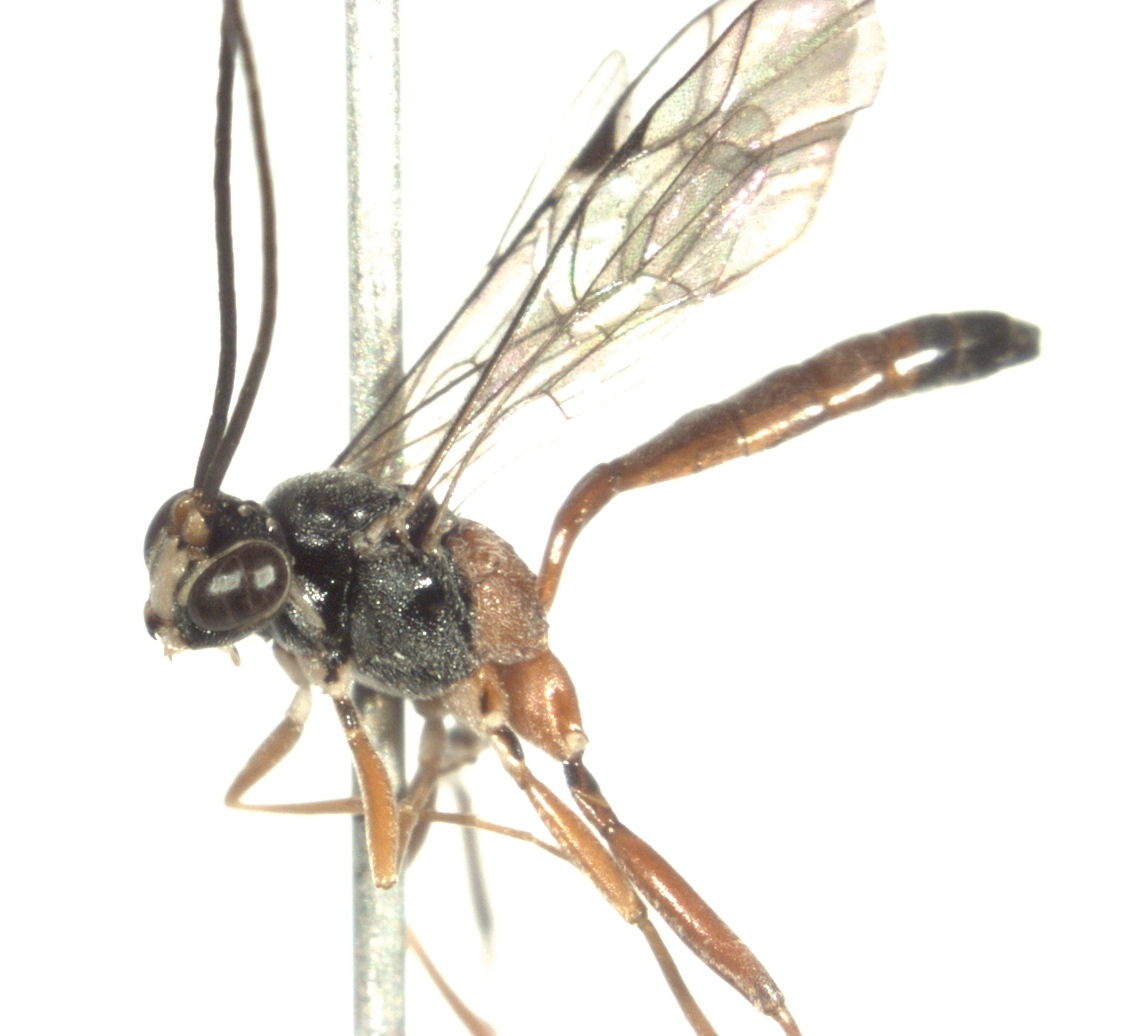
- Anacis sp.

Scientific classification
- Kingdom: Animalia
- Phylum: Arthropoda
- Class: Insecta
- Order: Hymenoptera
- Family: Ichneumonidae
- Subfamily: Cryptinae
- Tribe: Cryptini
- Subtribe: Mesostenina
- Genus: Anacis; Porter, 1967

= Anacis (wasp) =

Genus of wasps

Anacis is a genus of wasps in the family Ichneumonidae. It was described in 1967 by Charles C. Porter. The genus Biconus was once synonymized with Anacis by Porter in 2004, but Santos & Brady undid this, showing that it was unjustified and not supported by phylogenetics.

== Species ==
A total of 16 species are currently recognized:

- Anacis apoeca (Porter, 1986)
- Anacis atrorubra (Townes, 1970)
- Anacis camponotus (Porter, 1967)
- Anacis exul (Turner, 1919)
- Anacis festiva Porter, 1967
- Anacis flammigera Porter, 2003
- Anacis hercana (Porter, 1967)
- Anacis ignifera Porter, 2003
- Anacis rubripes (Spinola, 1851)
- Anacis rufipes (Porter, 1967)
- Anacis stangeorum Porter, 1970
- Anacis subflava (Porter, 1986)
- Anacis syntoma (Porter, 1967)
- Anacis tucumana Porter, 1973
- Anacis umbrifera Porter, 2003
- Anacis varipes (Porter, 1967)
