= Harpura =

- Village
- Country: India
- State: Punjab
- District: Gurdaspur
- Tehsil: Batala
- Region: Majha

Government
  - Type: Panchayat raj
  - Body: Gram panchayat

Area
  - Total: 625 ha (1,540 acres)

Population (2011)
  - Total: 2,864; 1,512/1,352 ♂/♀
  - Scheduled Castes: 895; 490/405 ♂/♀
  - Total Households: 479

Languages
  - Official: Punjabi
- Time zone: UTC+5:30 (IST)
- Telephone: 01871
- ISO 3166 code: IN-PB
- Vehicle registration: PB-18
- Website: gurdaspur.nic.in

Harpura is a village in Batala in Gurdaspur district of Punjab State, India. It is located 14 kilometres (8.7 mi) from sub district headquarter, 42 kilometres (26 mi) from district headquarter and 9 kilometres (5.6 mi) from Sri Hargobindpur. The village is administrated by Sarpanch an elected representative of the village.

== Demography ==
As of 2011, the village has a total number of 479 houses and a population of 2864 of which 1512 are males while 1352 are females. According to the report published by Census India in 2011, out of the total population of the village 895 people are from Schedule Caste and the village does not have any Schedule Tribe population so far.

== See also ==
- List of villages in India
