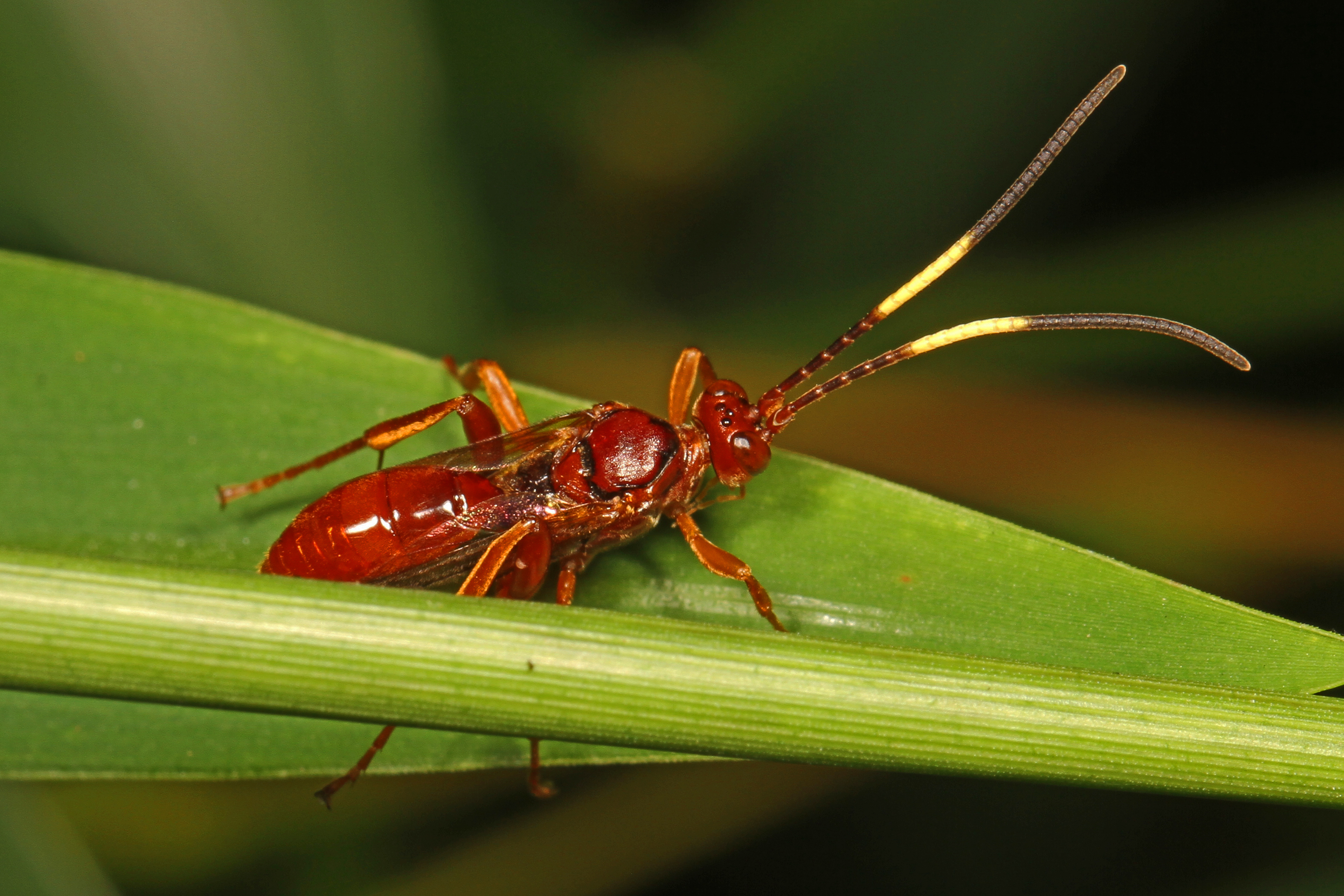
- Polytribax pallescens

Scientific classification
- Kingdom: Animalia
- Phylum: Arthropoda
- Class: Insecta
- Order: Hymenoptera
- Family: Ichneumonidae
- Tribe: Aptesini
- Genus: Polytribax; Förster, 1869

= Polytribax =

Genus of wasps

Polytribax is a genus of ichneumon wasps in the family Ichneumonidae. There are about 15 described species in Polytribax.

== Species ==
These 15 species belong to the genus Polytribax:

- Polytribax arrogans (Gravenhorst, 1829)^{c g}
- Polytribax castanis (Kim, 1955)^{c g}
- Polytribax contiguus (Cresson, 1864)^{c g b}
- Polytribax crotchii (Cresson, 1879)^{c}
- Polytribax fulvescens (Cresson, 1879)^{c}
- Polytribax fusiformis (Uchida, 1942)^{c g}
- Polytribax luteus (Cameron, 1903)^{c g}
- Polytribax pallescens (Viereck, 1911)^{c g b}
- Polytribax pelinocheirus (Gravenhorst, 1829)^{c g}
- Polytribax penetrator (Smith, 1874)^{c g}
- Polytribax perspicillator (Gravenhorst, 1807)^{c g}
- Polytribax picticornis (Ruthe, 1859)^{c g}
- Polytribax rufipes (Gravenhorst, 1829)^{c g}
- Polytribax senex (Kriechbaumer, 1893)^{c g}
- Polytribax xanthopterus (Szepligeti, 1910)^{c g}

Data sources: i = ITIS, c = Catalogue of Life, g = GBIF, b = Bugguide.net
