= Wuda (wasp) =

Scientific classification
- Kingdom: Animalia
- Phylum: Arthropoda
- Class: Insecta
- Order: Hymenoptera
- Family: Ichneumonidae
- Subfamily: Cryptinae
- Tribe: Cryptini
- Subtribe: Ceratocryptina
- Genus: Wuda; Cheesman, 1936

Species
- Wuda balteata (Cameron, 1913); Wuda frontalis (Szépligeti, 1916); Wuda major (Szépligeti, 1916); Wuda megaspilus (Cameron, 1911); Wuda nigrispina (Cameron, 1911); Wuda singularis Cheesman, 1936; Wuda tibialis (Cameron, 1911)

Genus of wasps

Wuda is a genus of ichneumon wasps in the subfamily Cryptinae, tribe Cryptini and subtribe Ceratocryptina. Species have an Oriental distribution.
