= Giraudia (wasp) =

Scientific classification
- Domain: Eukaryota
- Kingdom: Animalia
- Phylum: Arthropoda
- Class: Insecta
- Order: Hymenoptera
- Family: Ichneumonidae
- Subfamily: Cryptinae
- Genus: Giraudia; Förster, 1869

Genus of insects

Giraudia is a genus of parasitoid wasps belonging to the family Ichneumonidae.

The species of this genus are found in Europe, North America, and Asia.

Species:

- Giraudia ferruginea (Cushman, 1935)
- Giraudia fulva Townes & Gupta, 1962
