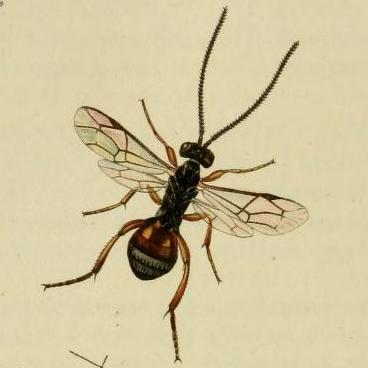
- Sphecophaga vesparum from British Entomology vol. 3

Scientific classification
- Domain: Eukaryota
- Kingdom: Animalia
- Phylum: Arthropoda
- Class: Insecta
- Order: Hymenoptera
- Family: Ichneumonidae
- Genus: Sphecophaga; Westwood, 1840

= Sphecophaga =

Genus of wasps

Sphecophaga is a genus of wasps belonging to the family Ichneumonidae.

The species of this genus are found in Europe and North America.

Species:

- Sphecophaga orientalis Donovan, 2002
- Sphecophaga vesparum (Curtis, 1828)
