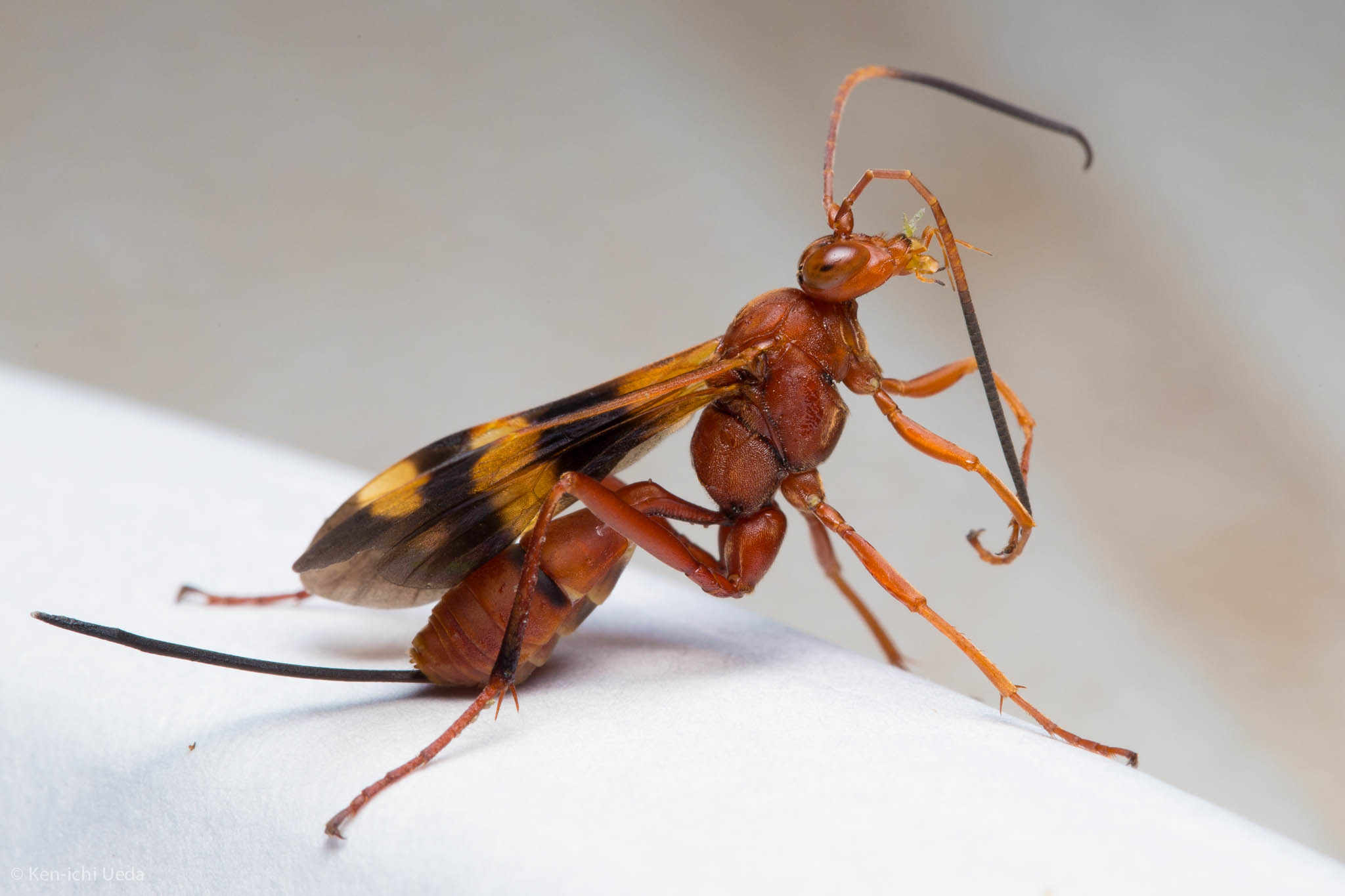
- Compsocryptus texensis

Scientific classification
- Kingdom: Animalia
- Phylum: Arthropoda
- Class: Insecta
- Order: Hymenoptera
- Family: Ichneumonidae
- Subfamily: Cryptinae
- Tribe: Cryptini
- Subtribe: Cryptina
- Genus: Compsocryptus; Ashmead, 1900

= Compsocryptus =

Genus of wasps

Compsocryptus is a genus of ichneumon wasps in the family Ichneumonidae.

== Species ==
The following 21 species belong to the genus Compsocryptus:

- Compsocryptus apicalis Townes, 1962
- Compsocryptus aridus Townes, 1962
- Compsocryptus buccatus (Cresson, 1872)
- Compsocryptus calipterus (Say, 1835)
- Compsocryptus crotchii (Cresson, 1879)
- Compsocryptus fasciipennis (Brullé, 1846)
- Compsocryptus fletcheri (Provancher, 1888)
- Compsocryptus fuscofasciatus (Brulle, 1846)
- Compsocryptus hugoi Kasparyan & Ruiz-Cancino, 2005
- Compsocryptus jamiesoni Nolfo, 1982
- Compsocryptus melanostigma (Brullé, 1846)
- Compsocryptus orientalis Alayo & Tzankov, 1974
- Compsocryptus pallens Townes, 1962
- Compsocryptus purpuripennis (Cresson, 1879)
- Compsocryptus resolutus (Cresson, 1879)
- Compsocryptus stangei Porter, 1989
- Compsocryptus texensis Townes, 1962
- Compsocryptus tricinctus Townes, 1962
- Compsocryptus turbatus (Cresson, 1879)
- Compsocryptus unicolor Townes, 1962
- Compsocryptus xanthostigma (Brullé, 1846)
