= Ischnus =

Scientific classification
- Domain: Eukaryota
- Kingdom: Animalia
- Phylum: Arthropoda
- Class: Insecta
- Order: Hymenoptera
- Family: Ichneumonidae
- Genus: Ischnus; Gravenhorst, 1829

Genus of wasps

Ischnus is a genus of parasitoid wasps belonging to the family Ichneumonidae.

The genus has almost cosmopolitan distribution.

Species:

- Ischnus agitator (Olivier, 1792)
- Ischnus alpinicola Heinrich, 1951
- Ischnus coxalis Kasparyan
