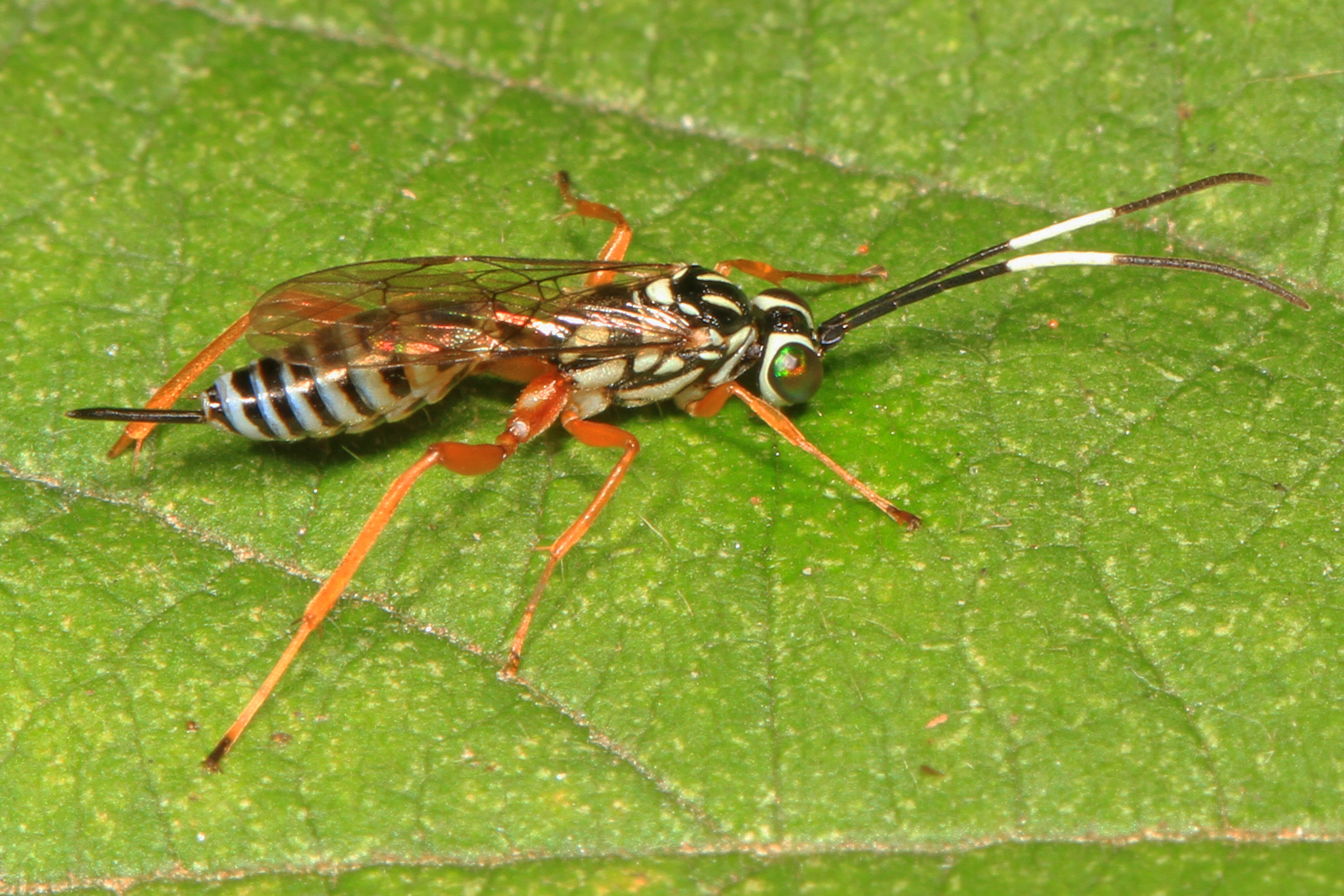

Scientific classification
- Kingdom: Animalia
- Phylum: Arthropoda
- Clade: Pancrustacea
- Class: Insecta
- Order: Hymenoptera
- Family: Ichneumonidae
- Genus: Lymeon
- Species: L. orbus

Binomial name
- Lymeon orbus (Say, 1835)

= Lymeon orbus =

Species of wasp

Lymeon orbus is a species of ichneumon wasp in the family Ichneumonidae. It can be found in the Eastern United States.
