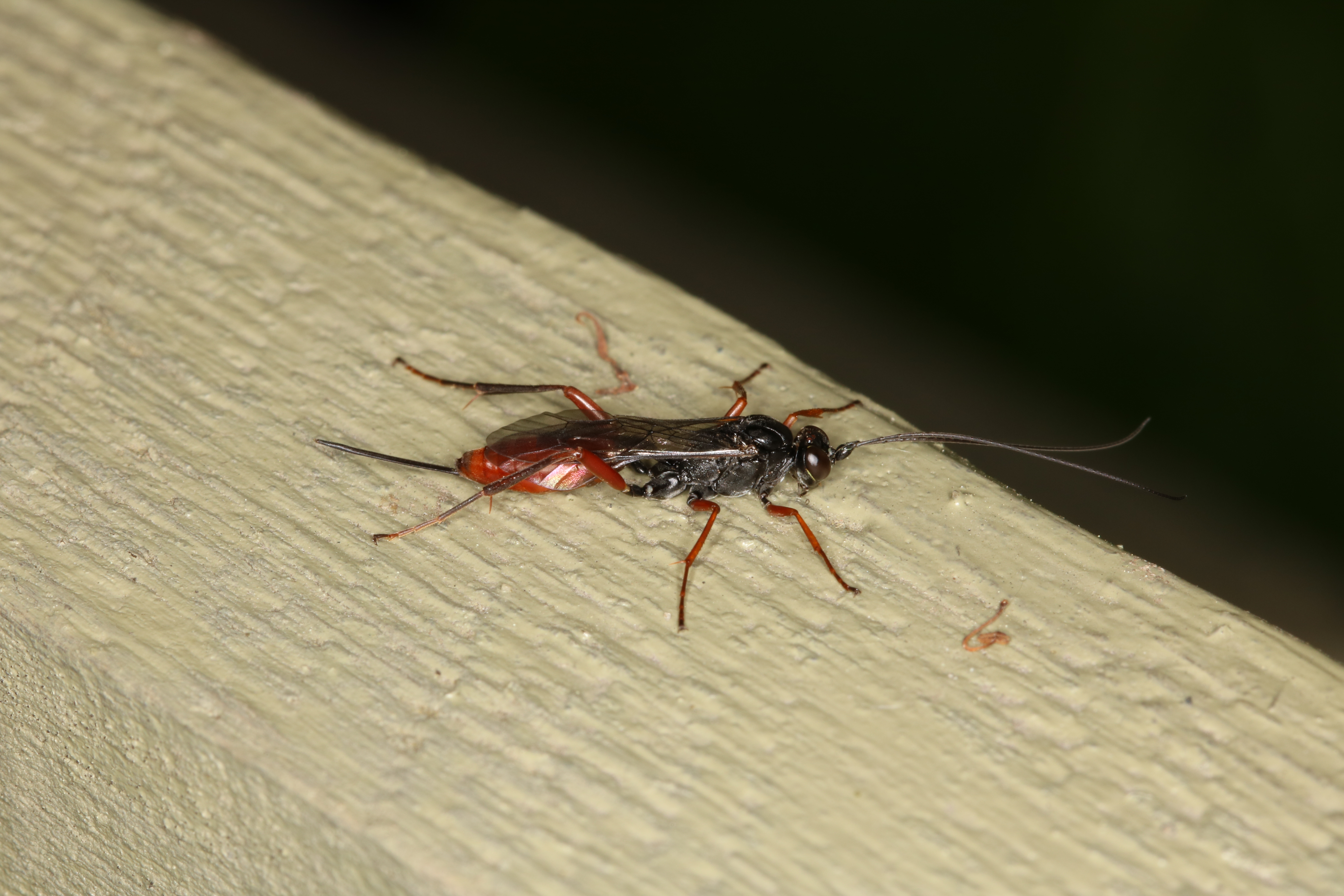
- Cryptus armator, in Søborg, Denmark, 2015

Scientific classification
- Kingdom: Animalia
- Phylum: Arthropoda
- Clade: Pancrustacea
- Class: Insecta
- Order: Hymenoptera
- Family: Ichneumonidae
- Subtribe: Cryptina
- Genus: Cryptus; Fabricius, 1804

Species
- Several, including: Cryptus armator Fabricius, 1804; fossil species: †Cryptus antiquus; †Cryptus capitatus; †Cryptus delineatus; †Cryptus morleyi; †Cryptus sepultus

Synonyms
- Itamoplex Förster, 1869; Plesiocryptus Cameron, 1903; Eucryptus Haldeman, 1842

= Cryptus =

Cryptus Temporal range: 37.2–Present Ma

Genus of wasps

Cryptus is a large genus of wasps in the family Ichneumonidae with 182 described species.

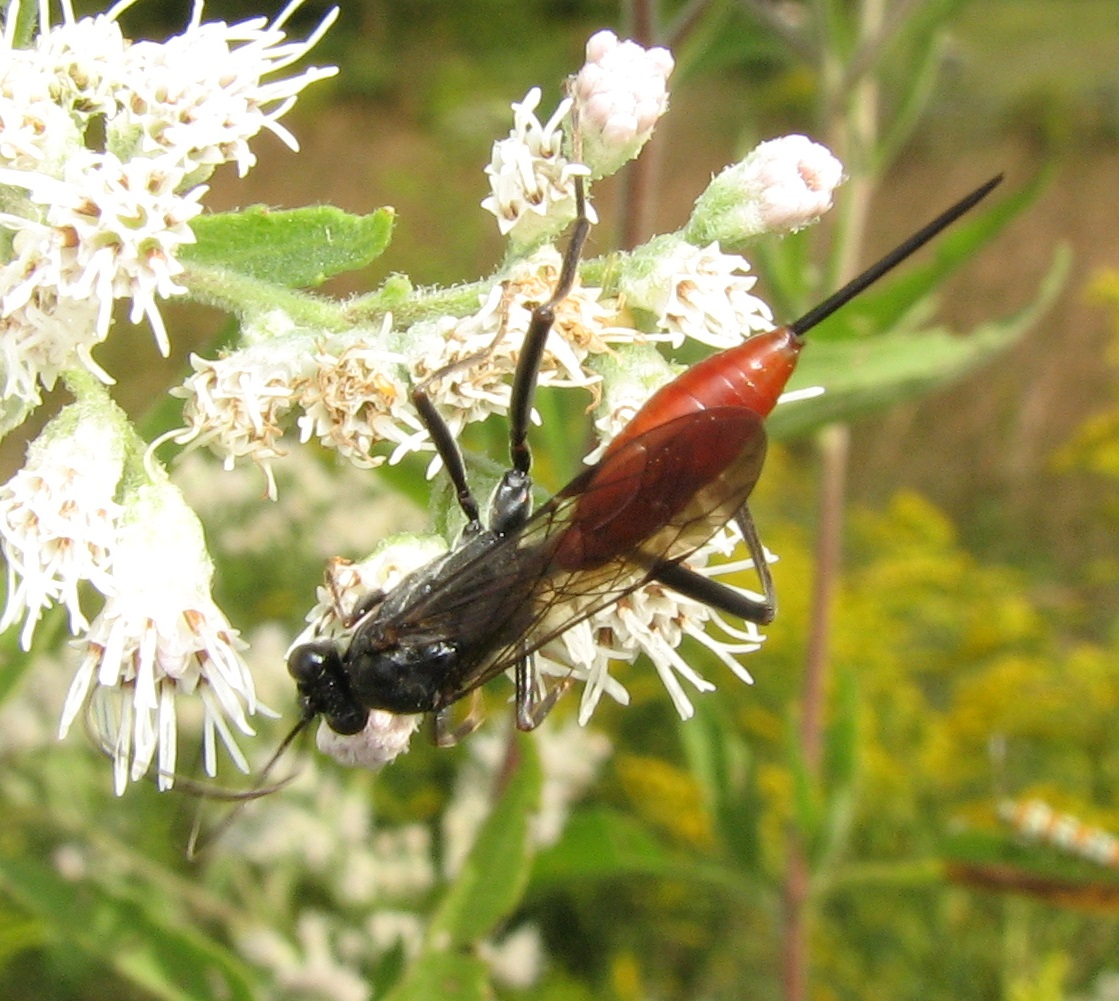
Cryptus albitarsis, female
