= Cratocryptus =

Scientific classification
- Domain: Eukaryota
- Kingdom: Animalia
- Phylum: Arthropoda
- Class: Insecta
- Order: Hymenoptera
- Family: Ichneumonidae
- Subfamily: Cryptinae
- Genus: Cratocryptus; Thomson, 1873

Genus of wasps

Cratocryptus is a genus of parasitoid wasps belonging to the family Ichneumonidae.

Species:

- Cratocryptus furcator
