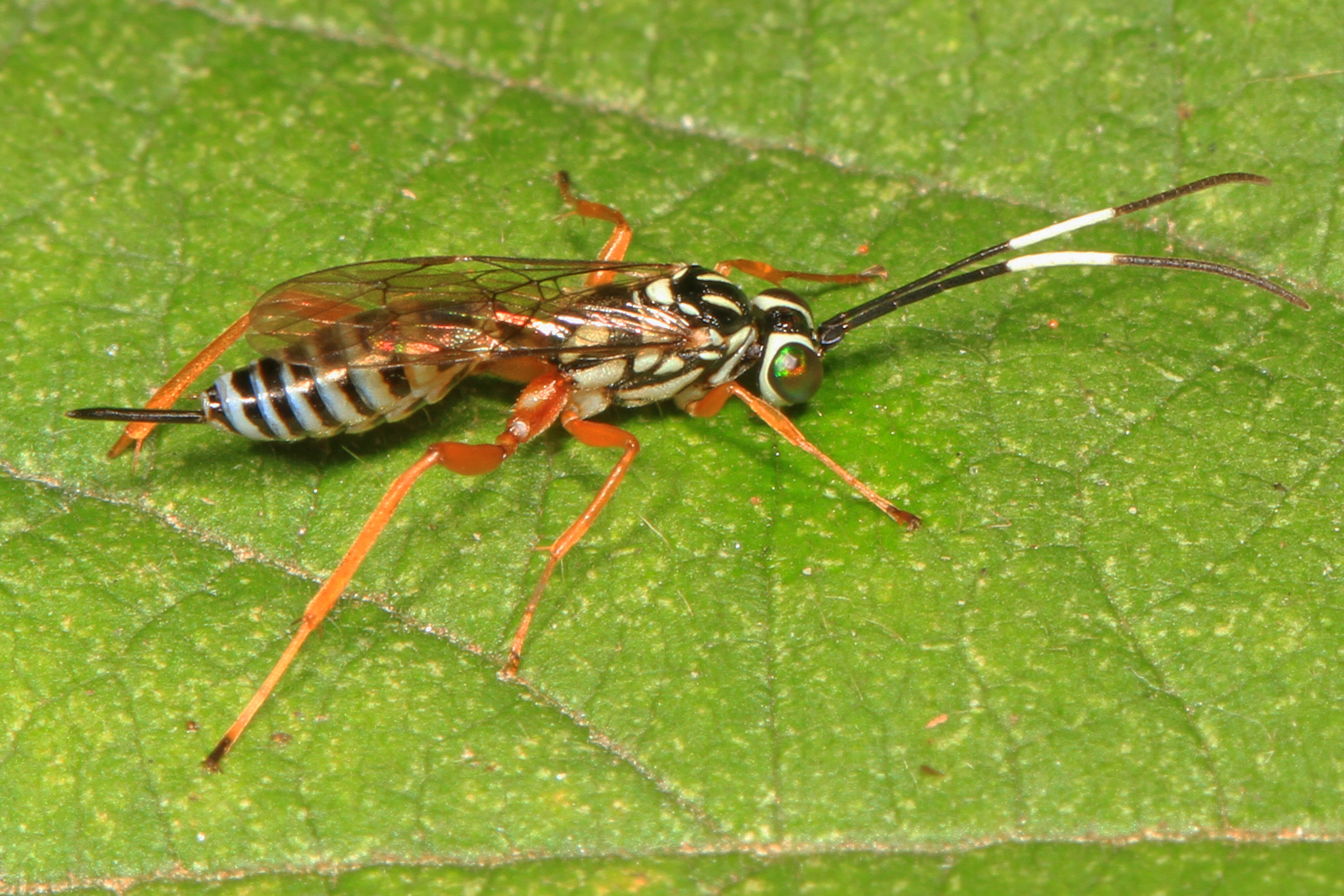
- Lymeon orbus

Scientific classification
- Kingdom: Animalia
- Phylum: Arthropoda
- Class: Insecta
- Order: Hymenoptera
- Family: Ichneumonidae
- Subtribe: Lymeonina
- Genus: Lymeon; Forster, 1869

= Lymeon =

Genus of wasps

Lymeon is a genus of ichneumon wasps in the family Ichneumonidae. There are at least 80 described species in Lymeon.

== Species ==
These 84 species belong to the genus Lymeon:

- Lymeon acceptus (Cresson, 1874)^{c g}
- Lymeon adjicialis (Cresson, 1874)^{c g}
- Lymeon adultus (Cresson, 1874)^{c g}
- Lymeon affinis (Taschenberg, 1876)^{c g}
- Lymeon albispina (Cameron, 1911)^{c}
- Lymeon alboannulatus (Taschenberg, 1876)^{c g}
- Lymeon apollinarii (Brethes, 1926)^{c g}
- Lymeon ariolator (Linnaeus, 1758)^{c g}
- Lymeon atrator Kasparyan & Ruiz-Cancino, 2004^{c g}
- Lymeon bicinctus (Cresson, 1865)^{c g}
- Lymeon bifasciator (Thunberg, 1822)^{c g}
- Lymeon bifasciatus (Szepligeti, 1916)^{c}
- Lymeon brasiliensis (Brethes, 1927)^{c}
- Lymeon caney Tzankov & Alayo, 1974^{c g}
- Lymeon cinctipes (Cameron, 1911)^{c g}
- Lymeon cinctiventris (Cushman, 1929)^{c g}
- Lymeon clavatorius (Fabricius, 1804)^{c g}
- Lymeon cratodontus (Cameron, 1911)^{c g}
- Lymeon curtispinus (Cameron, 1911)^{c g}
- Lymeon dieloceri (Costa Lima, 1937)^{c g}
- Lymeon fasciatiipennis (Cameron, 1911)^{c g}
- Lymeon fasciipennis (Brulle, 1846)^{c}
- Lymeon flavovariegatus (Cameron, 1886)^{c g}
- Lymeon fuscipennis (Brulle, 1846)^{c}
- Lymeon gracilipes (Brues & Richardson, 1913)^{c g}
- Lymeon guyanaensis (Cameron, 1911)^{c g}
- Lymeon haemorrhoidalis (Taschenberg, 1876)^{c g}
- Lymeon imbecillis (Cresson, 1868)^{c g}
- Lymeon imitatorius (Fabricius, 1804)^{c g}
- Lymeon ingenuus (Cresson, 1874)^{c g}
- Lymeon interruptus (Cameron, 1911)^{c g}
- Lymeon junctus (Cresson, 1874)^{c g}
- Lymeon lassatus (Cresson, 1874)^{c g}
- Lymeon lepidus (Brulle, 1846)^{c}
- Lymeon maculipes (Cameron, 1904)^{c g}
- Lymeon mandibularis Kasparyan & Ruiz-Cancino, 2004^{c g}
- Lymeon mexicanus (Cameron, 1886)^{c}
- Lymeon mimeticus Tzankov & Alayo, 1974^{c g}
- Lymeon minutus Kasparyan & Ruiz^{g}
- Lymeon montanus Tzankov & Alayo, 1974^{c g}
- Lymeon moratus (Cresson, 1874)^{c g}
- Lymeon nasutus (Pratt, 1945)^{c g}
- Lymeon nigriceps (Szepligeti, 1916)^{c}
- Lymeon nigromaculatus (Taschenberg, 1876)^{c g}
- Lymeon novatus (Cresson, 1874)^{c g}
- Lymeon orbus (Say, 1835)^{c g b}
- Lymeon ornatipennis (Cameron, 1911)^{c}
- Lymeon ovivorus (Hancock, 1926)^{c g}
- Lymeon patruelis (Cresson, 1874)^{c g}
- Lymeon photopsis (Viereck, 1913)^{c g}
- Lymeon pilosus (Taschenberg, 1876)^{c g}
- Lymeon pleuralis (Szepligeti, 1916)^{c g}
- Lymeon praedator (Fabricius, 1804)^{c g}
- Lymeon pulcher (Dalla Torre, 1902)^{c g}
- Lymeon pulcratorius (Thunberg, 1822)^{c g}
- Lymeon rufatus Kasparyan & Ruiz-Cancino, 2004^{c g}
- Lymeon ruficeps (Szepligeti, 1916)^{c}
- Lymeon rufinotum Kasparyan & Ruiz-Cancino, 2004^{c g}
- Lymeon rufipes (Szepligeti, 1916)^{c}
- Lymeon rufithorax (Cameron, 1886)^{c}
- Lymeon rufiventris (Brulle, 1846)^{c}
- Lymeon rufoalbus Kasparyan & Ruiz-Cancino, 2004^{c g}
- Lymeon rufoniger Kasparyan & Ruiz-Cancino, 2004^{c g}
- Lymeon rufotibialis Kasparyan & Ruiz-Cancino, 2004^{c g}
- Lymeon sanguineus (Taschenberg, 1876)^{c g}
- Lymeon setosus (Szepligeti, 1916)^{c}
- Lymeon sexlineatus (Cameron, 1886)^{c}
- Lymeon striatus (Brulle, 1846)^{c}
- Lymeon subflavescens (Cresson, 1865)^{c g}
- Lymeon sulsus (Cresson, 1874)^{c g}
- Lymeon tantillus (Cresson, 1874)^{c g}
- Lymeon tarsalis (Szepligeti, 1916)^{c g}
- Lymeon tinctipennis Kasparyan & Ruiz-Cancino, 2004^{c g}
- Lymeon tobiasi Kasparyan, 2004^{c g}
- Lymeon transilis (Cresson, 1874)^{c g}
- Lymeon tricolor (Brulle, 1846)^{c}
- Lymeon tricoloripes Kasparyan & Ruiz-Cancino, 2004^{c g}
- Lymeon trifasciatellus (Dalla Torre, 1902)^{c g}
- Lymeon tuheitensis (Brues & Richardson, 1913)^{c g}
- Lymeon utilis (Szepligeti, 1916)^{c g}
- Lymeon varicoxa (Szepligeti, 1916)^{c}
- Lymeon variicoxa (Szepligeti, 1916)^{c g}
- Lymeon xanthogaster (Brulle, 1846)^{c}
- Lymeon yanegai Kasparyan, 2004^{c g}

Data sources: i = ITIS, c = Catalogue of Life, g = GBIF, b = Bugguide.net
