= Madagascesa =

Scientific classification
- Domain: Eukaryota
- Kingdom: Animalia
- Phylum: Arthropoda
- Class: Insecta
- Order: Hymenoptera
- Family: Ichneumonidae
- Genus: Madagascesa; Koçak & Kemal, 2008

Genus of insects

Madagascesa is a genus of parasitoid wasps belonging to the family Ichneumonidae.

Species:

- Madagascesa nigrifacies
