= Fenixia =

Scientific classification
- Kingdom: Plantae
- Clade: Embryophytes
- Clade: Tracheophytes
- Clade: Angiosperms
- Clade: Eudicots
- Clade: Asterids
- Order: Asterales
- Family: Asteraceae
- Subfamily: Asteroideae
- Tribe: Heliantheae
- Subtribe: Ecliptinae
- Genus: Fenixia; Merr.
- Species: F. pauciflora

Binomial name
- Fenixia pauciflora Merr.

Genus of flowering plants

Fenixia is a genus of flowering plants in the family Asteraceae.

There is only one known species, Fenixia pauciflora, endemic to the Philippines.
