= Parmortha =

Scientific classification
- Domain: Eukaryota
- Kingdom: Animalia
- Phylum: Arthropoda
- Class: Insecta
- Order: Hymenoptera
- Family: Ichneumonidae
- Genus: Parmortha; Townes, 1962

Genus of insects

Parmortha is a genus of parasitoid wasps belonging to the family Ichneumonidae.

The species of this genus are found in Europe, Africa and Northern America.

Species:

- Parmortha circumcincta (Provancher, 1879)
- Parmortha parvula (Gravenhorst, 1829)
