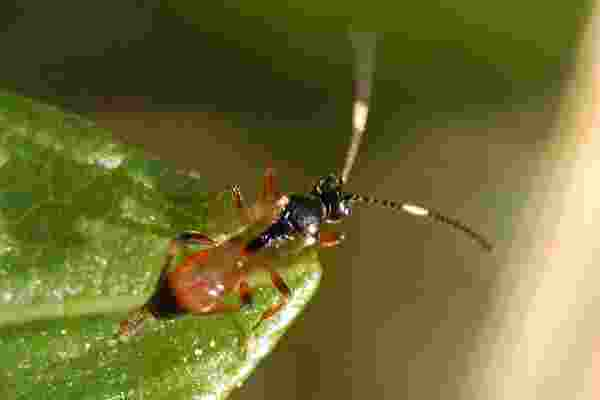
- Oresbius galactinus

Scientific classification
- Domain: Eukaryota
- Kingdom: Animalia
- Phylum: Arthropoda
- Class: Insecta
- Order: Hymenoptera
- Family: Ichneumonidae
- Genus: Oresbius; Marshall, 1867

= Oresbius =

Genus of insects

Oresbius is a genus of parasitoid wasps belonging to the family Ichneumonidae.

The species of this genus are found in Europe and Northern America.

== Selected species ==
- Oresbius alpinophilus Sawoniewicz, 1993
- Oresbius ambulator (Roman, 1909)
