= Pleolophus =

Scientific classification
- Kingdom: Animalia
- Phylum: Arthropoda
- Class: Insecta
- Order: Hymenoptera
- Family: Ichneumonidae
- Genus: Pleolophus; Townes, 1962

Genus of wasps

Pleolophus is a genus of parasitoid wasps belonging to the family Ichneumonidae.

The species of this genus are found in Europe and Northern America.

Species:

- Pleolophus annulosus Townes, 1962
- Pleolophus astrictus Townes, 1962
