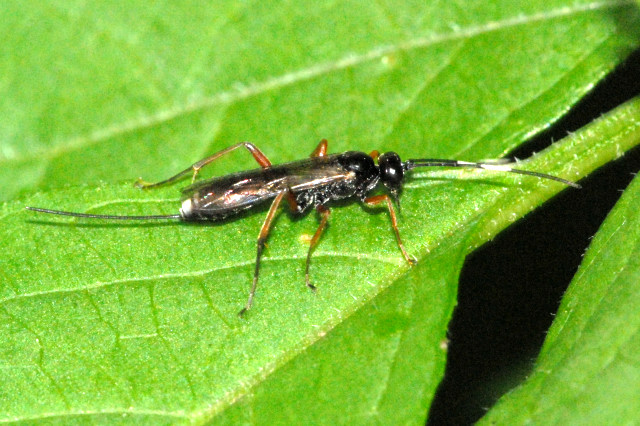
- Cubocephalus erythrinus

Scientific classification
- Domain: Eukaryota
- Kingdom: Animalia
- Phylum: Arthropoda
- Class: Insecta
- Order: Hymenoptera
- Family: Ichneumonidae
- Genus: Cubocephalus; Ratzeburg, 1848

= Cubocephalus =

Genus of wasps

Cubocephalus is a genus of parasitoid wasps belonging to the family Ichneumonidae.

The species of this genus are found in Europe, Southern Africa and North America.

== Species ==
- Cubocephalus alacris (Cresson, 1864)
- Cubocephalus alticola (Habermehl, 1935)
- Cubocephalus anatorius (Gravenhorst, 1829)
- Cubocephalus annectus Townes, 1944
- Cubocephalus annulatus (Cresson, 1864)
- Cubocephalus annulitarsis (Thomson, 1873)
- Cubocephalus aquilonius Townes & Gupta, 1962
- Cubocephalus ardens Townes, 1962
- Cubocephalus armillatus Walkley, 1958
- Cubocephalus ashmeadii (Harrington, 1894)
- Cubocephalus associator (Thunberg, 1822)
- Cubocephalus atrator (Walker, 1874)
- Cubocephalus atriclunis Townes & Gupta, 1962
- Cubocephalus baldaufii (Dalla Torre, 1902)
- Cubocephalus brevicornis (Taschenberg, 1865)
- Cubocephalus caligneus Townes, 1962
- Cubocephalus callicerus Townes, 1962
- Cubocephalus carnosus Townes, 1962
- Cubocephalus cincticornis (Cresson, 1864)
- Cubocephalus contractus Townes & Gupta, 1962
- Cubocephalus crassivalvus Hinz, 1969
- Cubocephalus denticulatus Townes, 1962
- Cubocephalus distinctor (Thunberg, 1822)
- Cubocephalus dreisbachi Townes, 1962
- Cubocephalus euryops Townes, 1962
- Cubocephalus femoralis (Thomson, 1873)
- Cubocephalus flavipes Townes, 1962
- Cubocephalus fortipes (Gravenhorst, 1829)
- Cubocephalus hebes Townes, 1962
- Cubocephalus heiglii (Dalla Torre, 1902)
- Cubocephalus hirtipes Townes, 1962
- Cubocephalus impressus (Provancher, 1875)
- Cubocephalus incisus Townes & Gupta, 1962
- Cubocephalus incognitus (Provancher, 1886)
- Cubocephalus incurvator (Aubert, 1977)
- Cubocephalus inhabilis (Provancher, 1877)
- Cubocephalus insidiator (Gravenhorst, 1829)
- Cubocephalus kasparyani Schwarz, 2014
- Cubocephalus lacteator (Gravenhorst, 1829)
- Cubocephalus lapponicus (Zetterstedt, 1838)
- Cubocephalus laticeps (Cresson, 1872)
- Cubocephalus leucopygus (Kriechbaumer, 1891)
- Cubocephalus lissopleuris Townes & Gupta, 1962
- Cubocephalus longicauda (Thomson, 1883)
- Cubocephalus longicaudus (Provancher, 1886)
- Cubocephalus maurus (Cresson, 1879)
- Cubocephalus miarus Townes & Gupta, 1962
- Cubocephalus micans Townes, 1962
- Cubocephalus minutor (Zetterstedt, 1838)
- Cubocephalus mirabilis (Heinrich, 1949)
- Cubocephalus molaris Townes & Gupta, 1962
- Cubocephalus montanus (Gravenhorst, 1829)
- Cubocephalus nigriventris (Thomson, 1874)
- Cubocephalus occidentalis (Provancher, 1875)
- Cubocephalus oviventris (Gravenhorst, 1829)
- Cubocephalus pallidus (Cresson, 1864)
- Cubocephalus pentagonalis (Provancher, 1886)
- Cubocephalus personatus Townes, 1962
- Cubocephalus pictus Townes, 1962
- Cubocephalus prolixus Townes & Gupta, 1962
- Cubocephalus rufibasis Townes & Gupta, 1962
- Cubocephalus scorteus Townes, 1962
- Cubocephalus semifulvus Townes, 1962
- Cubocephalus semirufus (Brulle, 1846)
- Cubocephalus septentrionalis (Roman, 1909)
- Cubocephalus silesiacus Habermehl, 1911
- Cubocephalus sperator (Muller, 1776)
- Cubocephalus sternocerus (Thomson, 1873)
- Cubocephalus sternolophus Townes, 1962
- Cubocephalus subpolitus Townes, 1962
- Cubocephalus terebrator (Statz, 1936)
- Cubocephalus thomsoni (Habermehl, 1911)
- Cubocephalus tincticoxis Townes, 1962
