= Pierre Jules Tosquinet =

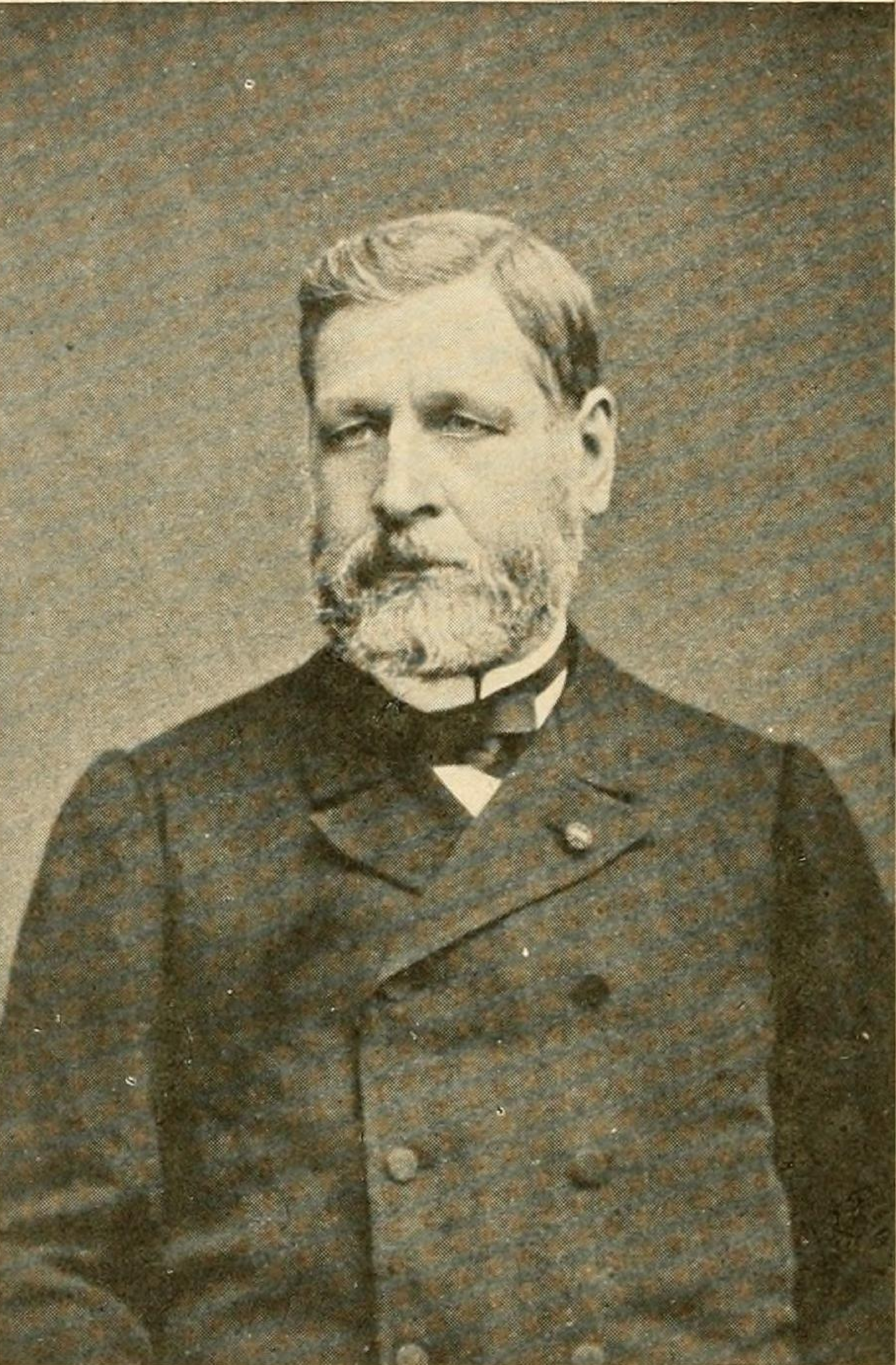
Dr. Tosquinet, as published in the Mémoires de la Société Entomologique de Belgique.

Dr. Pierre Jules Tosquinet (16 February 1824, in Bastogne – 28 October 1902, in Saint-Gilles) was a physician and entomologist. He served as Military Inspector General for Health of the Belgian Army and the President of the Entomological Society of Belgium. He was also president of the Central State Commission on Vaccination, and a recipient of the Order of Leopold.

== Biography ==
Tosquinet studied medicine at the Free University of Brussels. After graduation, he was commissioned as a doctor in the army's medical service, where he rose to become director of the Brussels Military Hospital. By the time he left the military, he held the title of "Honorary Inspector-General of the Medical Service."

In addition to his medical work, Tosquinet took an interest in the natural sciences. He founded a horticultural association with Barthélemy Dumortier in Tournai in 1860. In 1862, he was a founding member of the Royal Belgian Botanical Association. He collected a number of plants unknown to science, which were described by other botanists such as Gérard Daniel Westendorp.

Tosquinet collected many plant galls on his excursions, which led to the collection and study wasps in the superfamily Cynipoidea. He became a member of the Société Entomologique de Belgique and was elected President for 1887 and 1888, and later for 1893/1894 and 1901/1902.

Tosquinet eventually specialized in the study of the parasitic wasps (Ichneumonidae). Together with Jean-Charles Jacobs, he worked on a catalog of the Belgian parasitoid wasps, two parts of which appeared before his death: the group of the Tryphonides (1890) and the Pimplides (1897). He also published a monograph on the parasitic wasps of Africa in the Mémoires of the Société Entomologique in 1897, and developed his own collection of exotic parasitic wasps. In 1900 he described the fleece-winged insects collected by the Belgian Antarctic Expedition.

Some genera of parasitic wasps that Tosquinet has described are Mansa, Satrius, Hieroceryx, Occia, and Encardia.
