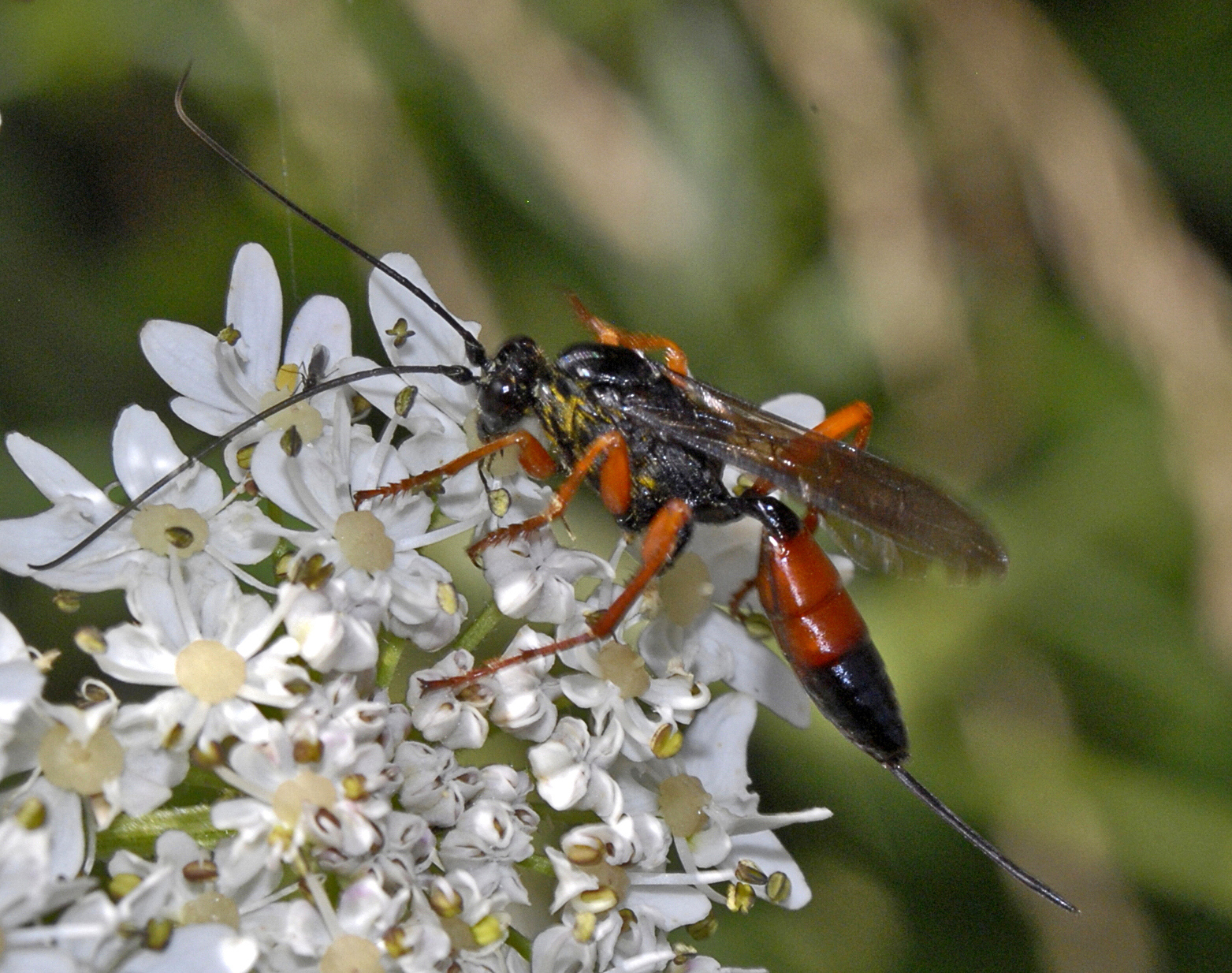
- Meringopus calescens

Scientific classification
- Kingdom: Animalia
- Phylum: Arthropoda
- Clade: Pancrustacea
- Class: Insecta
- Order: Hymenoptera
- Family: Ichneumonidae
- Subfamily: Cryptinae
- Genus: Meringopus; Förster, 1869

= Meringopus =

Genus of wasps

Meringopus is a genus of wasps belonging to the family Ichneumonidae.

== Species ==
Species within this genus include:

- Meringopus armatus
- Meringopus asymmetricus
- Meringopus attentorius
- Meringopus calescens
- Meringopus coronadoae
- Meringopus cyanator
- Meringopus dirus
- Meringopus eurinus
- Meringopus fasciatus
- Meringopus genatus
- Meringopus melanator
- Meringopus naitor
- Meringopus nigerrimus
- Meringopus nursei
- Meringopus pacificus
- Meringopus palmipes
- Meringopus pamirensis
- Meringopus persicator
- Meringopus pilosus
- Meringopus pseudonymus
- Meringopus punicus
- Meringopus relativus
- Meringopus reverendus
- Meringopus serraticaudus
- Meringopus sogdianus
- Meringopus sovinskii
- Meringopus suspicabilis
- Meringopus symmetricus
- Meringopus tejonensis
- Meringopus titillator
- Meringopus turanus
- Meringopus vancouverensis
