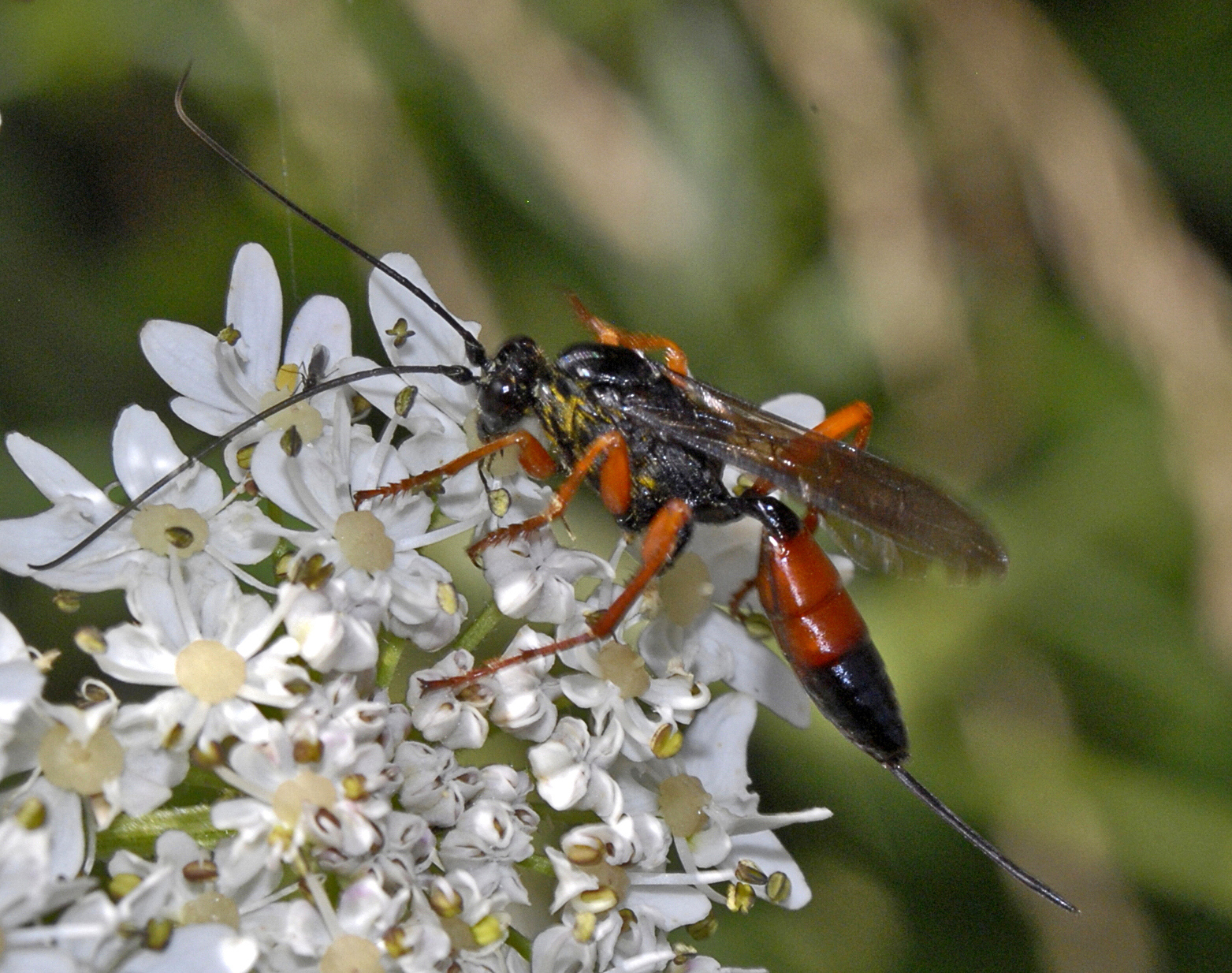
- Female

Scientific classification
- Kingdom: Animalia
- Phylum: Arthropoda
- Clade: Pancrustacea
- Class: Insecta
- Order: Hymenoptera
- Family: Ichneumonidae
- Genus: Meringopus
- Species: M. calescens

Binomial name
- Meringopus calescens (Gravenhorst, 1829)

Synonyms
- Meringopus crassitarsis (Habermehl, 1918); Meringopus nevadensis (Seyrig, 1928); Meringopus tuberculipes (Rudow, 1886)

= Meringopus calescens =

Species of wasp

Meringopus calescens is a species of wasp belonging to the family Ichneumonidae first described by Johann Ludwig Christian Gravenhorst in 1829.

== Subspecies ==
- Meringopus calescens persicus Heinrich, 1937
- Meringopus calescens robustus (Cresson, 1864)

== Distribution ==
This holarctic species is present in Afghanistan, Austria, Azerbaijan, Bulgaria, Canada, China, Czech Republic, Slovakia, France, Germany, Greece, India, Iran, Italy, Kazakhstan, Kyrgyzstan, Mongolia, Morocco, Poland, Russia, Spain, Switzerland, Tajikistan, Turkey and United States.

== Description ==
Meringopus calescens can reach a length of about 16 millimetres (0.63 in) in females and about 15 millimetres (0.59 in) in males. These relatively large Ichneumonid have a black head and a well defined clypeus, with some heavy punctures. Thorax is black and sculptured. Mesoscutum is polished, with irregular punctures. Wings are quite infuscate. Legs show black coxae and trochanters, but the remaining parts are orange. Abdomen has a mostly fuscous 1st segment, 2nd and 3rd segments are orange, while the apical segments are mostly black. Ovipositor is slightly upcurved and can reach about 5 mm.

== Behavior ==
These ichneumonid wasps have been observed apparently attempting to parasitize the sphecids Ammophila sabulosa and Podalonia affinis, but they also parasitize Saturnia pyri.

== Bibliography ==
- Seyrig, A. (1928) Etudes sur les Ichneumonides (Hymen.) III., Eos. 4:375-398.
- Habermehl, H. (1918) Beitrage zur Kenntnis der palaearktischen Ichneumonidenfauna., Zeitschrift fur Wissenschaftliche Insektenbiologie. 14:48-55,118-119,145-152.
- Rudow, F. (1886) Neue Cryptus., Societas Entomologica. Zurich. 1(15):115.
- Gravenhorst, J.L.C. (1829) Ichneumonologia Europaea. Pars II., Vratislaviae. 989 pp.
