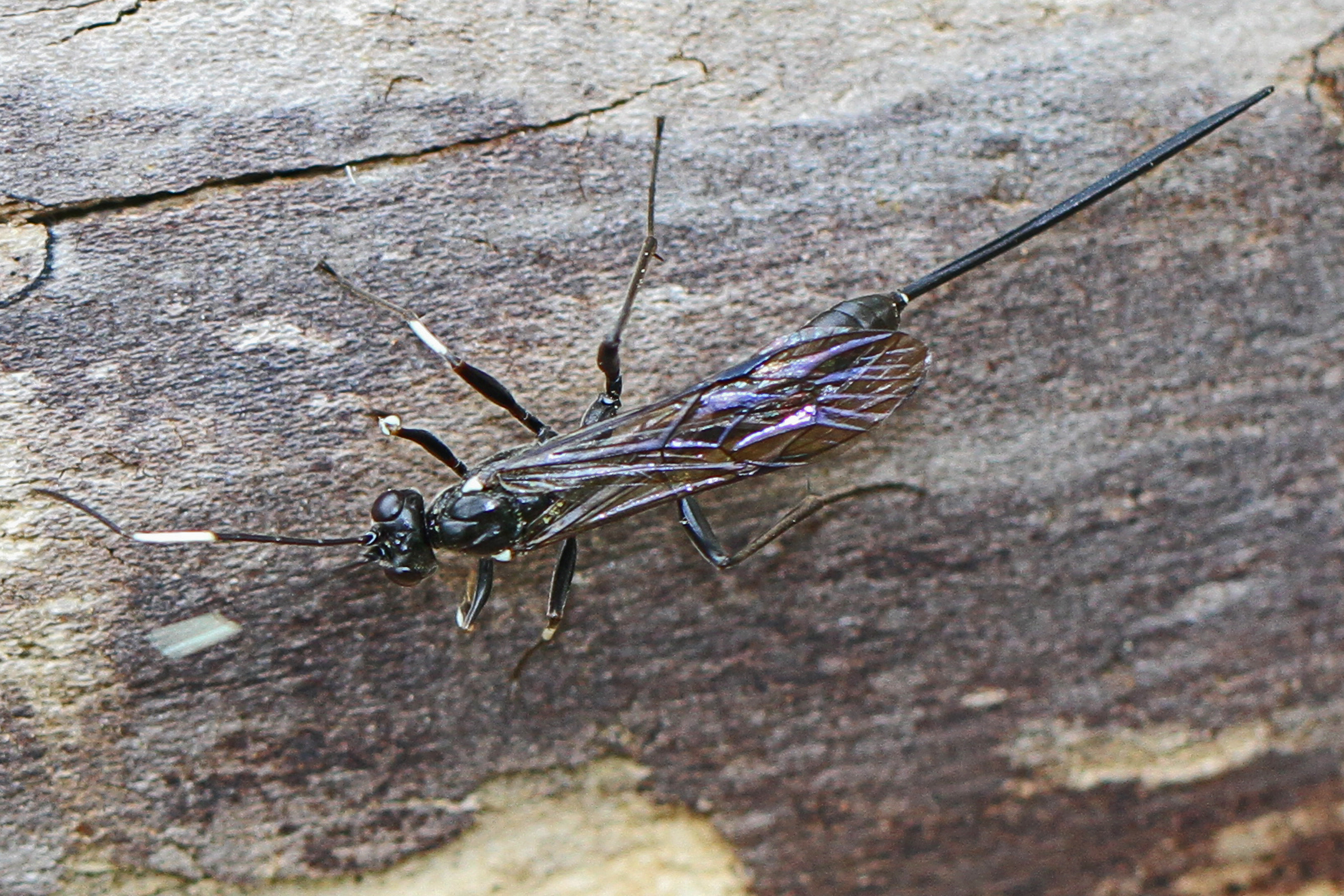
- Echthrus niger

Scientific classification
- Kingdom: Animalia
- Phylum: Arthropoda
- Class: Insecta
- Order: Hymenoptera
- Family: Ichneumonidae
- Subfamily: Cryptinae
- Tribe: Aptesini
- Genus: Echthrus

= Echthrus =

Genus of wasps

Echthrus is a genus of ichneumon wasps in the family Ichneumonidae.

== Species ==
The following species are recognised in the genus Echthrus:

- Echthrus abdominalis Cresson 1868
- Echthrus adillae Davis, 1895
- Echthrus angustatus Tosquinet 1900
- Echthrus brevicornis Brischke 1865
- Echthrus coracinus Gupta 1978
- Echthrus cryptiformis (Ratzeburg 1848)
- Echthrus longicornis (Ratzeburg 1848)
- Echthrus niger Cresson, 1868
- Echthrus reluctator (Linnaeus 1758)
- Echthrus rufipes Uchida 1929
- Echthrus tuberculatus (Uchida 1929)
