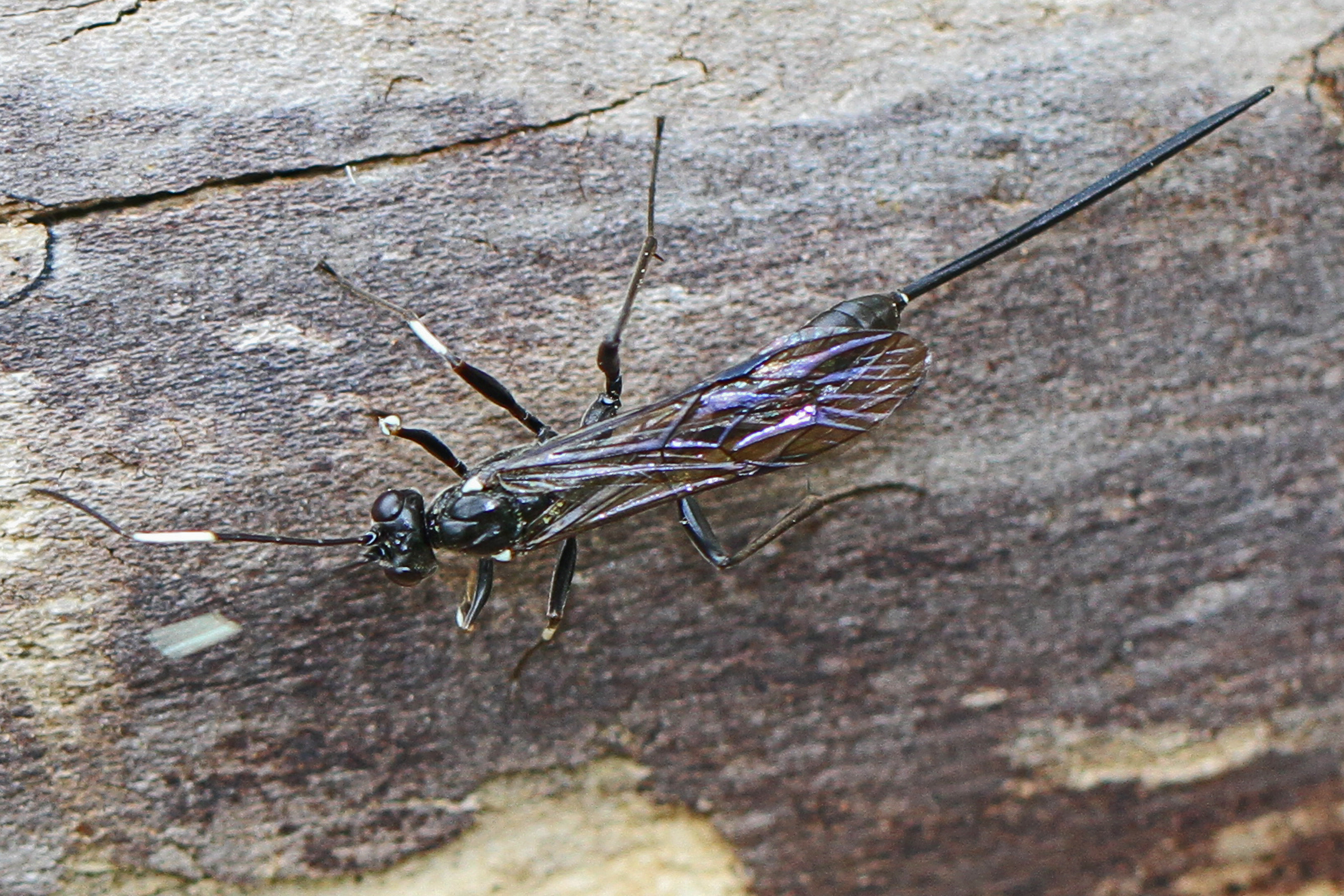

Scientific classification
- Kingdom: Animalia
- Phylum: Arthropoda
- Class: Insecta
- Order: Hymenoptera
- Family: Ichneumonidae
- Genus: Echthrus
- Species: E. niger

Binomial name
- Echthrus niger Cresson, 1868

= Echthrus niger =

Species of wasp

Echthrus niger is a species of ichneumon wasp in the family Ichneumonidae.
