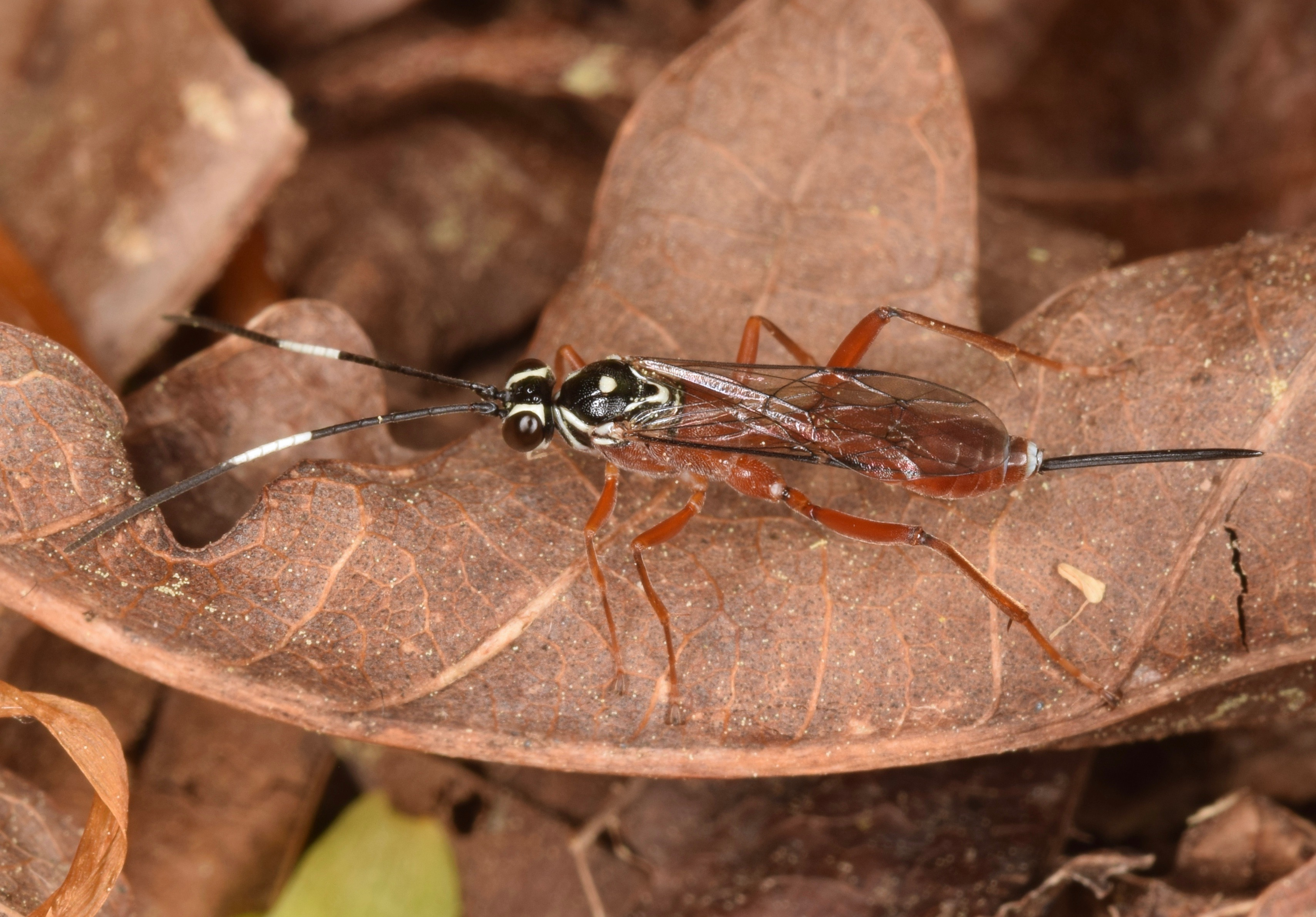
- Mesostenus thoracicus, female

Scientific classification
- Kingdom: Animalia
- Phylum: Arthropoda
- Class: Insecta
- Order: Hymenoptera
- Family: Ichneumonidae
- Subfamily: Cryptinae
- Tribe: Cryptini
- Subtribe: Mesostenina
- Genus: Mesostenus; Gravenhorst, 1829

Synonyms
- Stenaraeus Thomson, 1896

= Mesostenus =

Genus of wasps

Mesostenus is a genus of ichneumon wasps in the family Ichneumonidae. There are at least 60 described species in Mesostenus.

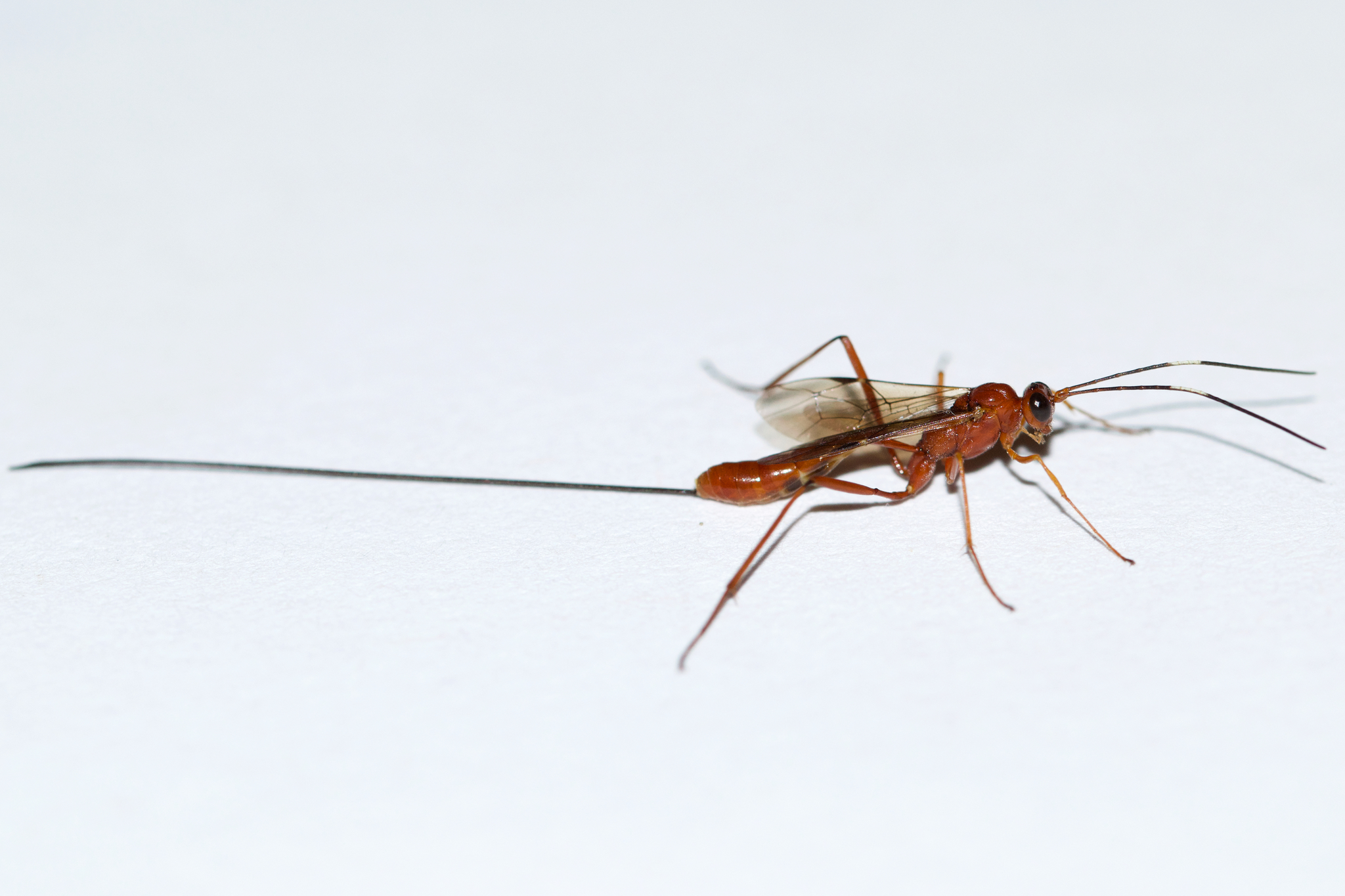
Mesostenus longicaudis, Canada

== Species ==
These 60 species belong to the genus Mesostenus:

- Mesostenus albinotatus Gravenhorst, 1829
- Mesostenus alvarengae Porter, 1973
- Mesostenus americanus Cresson, 1878
- Mesostenus angustus Townes, 1944
- Mesostenus ater Ratzeburg, 1852
- Mesostenus aureli Ciochia, 1973
- Mesostenus azerbajdzhanicus Abdinbekova, 1961
- Mesostenus cingulatellus Costa, 1886
- Mesostenus clitellatus Townes, 1962
- Mesostenus coreanus (Kim, 1955)
- Mesostenus corsicus (Szepligeti, 1916)
- Mesostenus crassifemur Thomson, 1888
- Mesostenus curvipes Taschenberg, 1876
- Mesostenus cuzcensis Porter, 1973
- Mesostenus dentifer Thomson, 1896
- Mesostenus eisenii Ashmead, 1894
- Mesostenus euoplus Porter, 1973
- Mesostenus fidalgoi Porter, 1974
- Mesostenus funebris Gravenhorst, 1829
- Mesostenus gracilis Cresson, 1864
- Mesostenus grammicus Gravenhorst, 1829
- Mesostenus gravenhorstii Spinola, 1840
- Mesostenus hypsipylaphagous Herrera-Florez et al., 2017
- Mesostenus kamileae Kaplan, 2024
- Mesostenus kozlovi Kokujev, 1909
- Mesostenus lanarius Gistel, 1857
- Mesostenus liogaster Townes, 1962
- Mesostenus longicaudis Cresson, 1872
- Mesostenus melanurus Cushman, 1929
- Mesostenus modestus Brues, 1906
- Mesostenus modicus Cresson, 1874
- Mesostenus nepomis Porter, 1973
- Mesostenus obtusus Momoi, 1966
- Mesostenus opuntiae Porter, 1977
- Mesostenus penetralis (Cameron, 1902)
- Mesostenus pertenuis Cresson, 1874
- Mesostenus pluvialis Porter, 1973
- Mesostenus punctatus (Szepligeti, 1908)
- Mesostenus roborowskii Kokujev, 1909
- Mesostenus rufalbator Aubert, 1959
- Mesostenus ruficoxis (Szepligeti, 1916)
- Mesostenus rufipes (Kim, 1955)
- Mesostenus rufoniger Meyer, 1922
- Mesostenus rufotinctus Provancher, 1874
- Mesostenus schmiedeknechti Ciochia, 1973
- Mesostenus sicarius Townes, 1962
- Mesostenus spec Gravenhorst, 1829
- Mesostenus subandinus Porter, 1973
- Mesostenus suigensis Uchida, 1930
- Mesostenus terani Porter, 1973
- Mesostenus thoracicus Cresson, 1864
- Mesostenus townesi Kanhekar & Nikam, 1989
- Mesostenus transfuga Gravenhorst, 1829
- Mesostenus tricarinatus Cameron, 1906
- Mesostenus truncatidens Schmiedeknecht, 1905
- Mesostenus turcator Aubert, 1972
- Mesostenus versicolor Viereck, 1912
- Mesostenus xerobates Porter, 1974
- Mesostenus xestus Porter, 1973
- Mesostenus yacochuyae Porter, 1973
