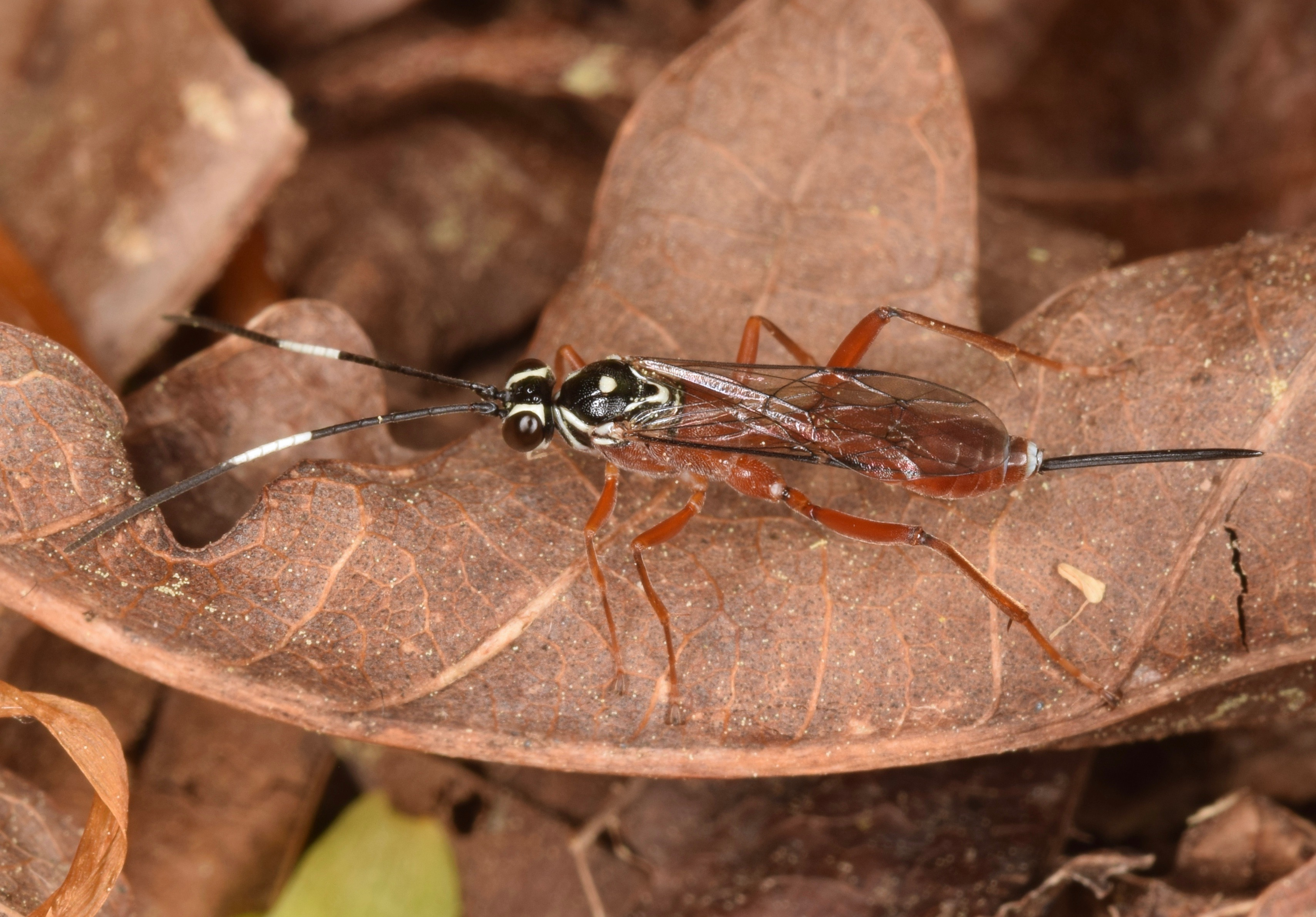
- Mesostenus thoracicus, female

Scientific classification
- Kingdom: Animalia
- Phylum: Arthropoda
- Class: Insecta
- Order: Hymenoptera
- Family: Ichneumonidae
- Subfamily: Cryptinae
- Tribe: Cryptini
- Subtribe: Mesostenina
- Genus: Mesostenus
- Species: M. thoracicus

Binomial name
- Mesostenus thoracicus Cresson, 1864

Synonyms
- Mesostenus erythrogaster Ashmead, 1890

= Mesostenus thoracicus =

Species of wasps

Mesostenus thoracicus is a species of ichneumon wasp in the family Ichneumonidae. It is found in North America.

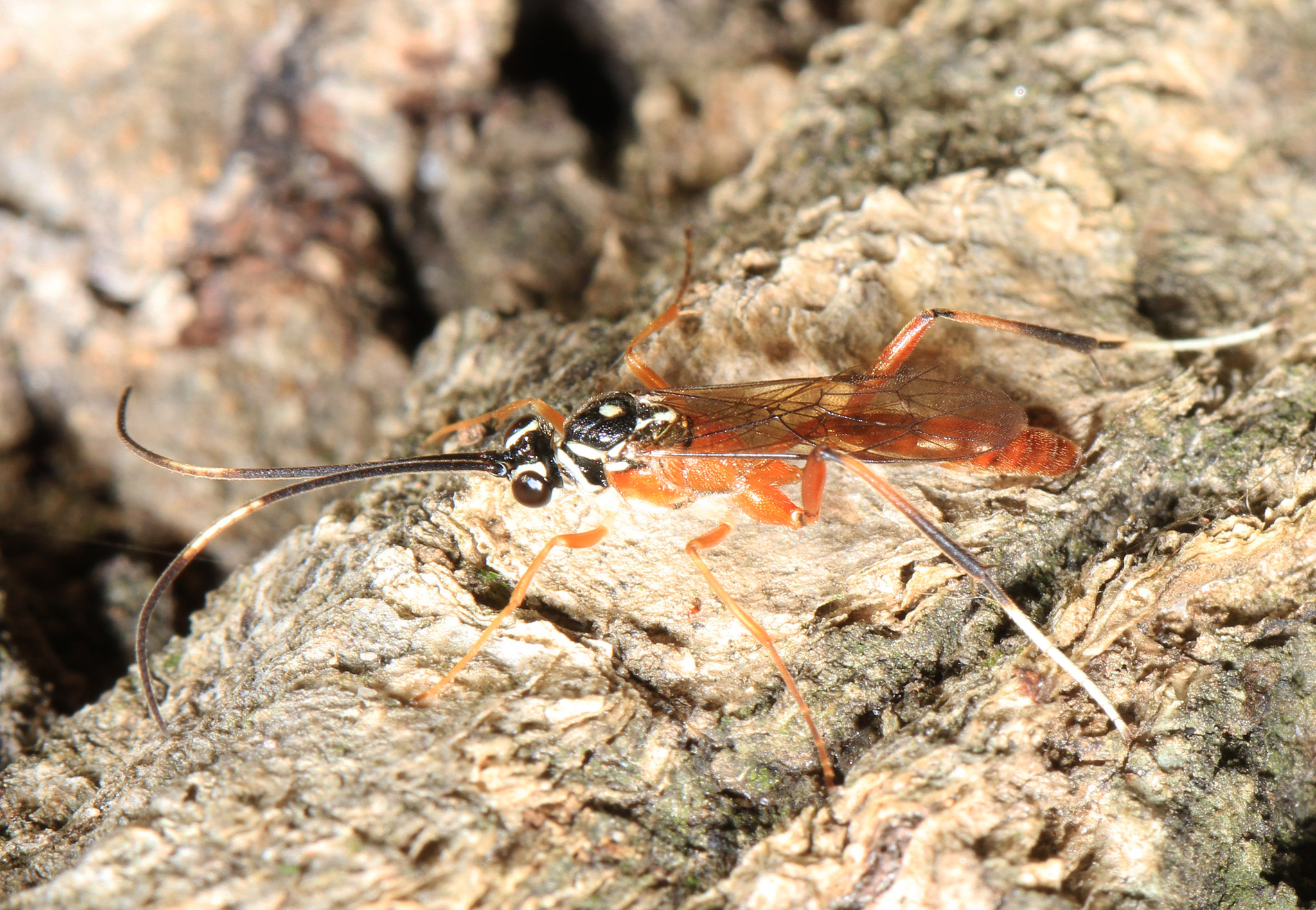
Mesostenus thoracicus, Virginia
