= List of crop plants pollinated by bees =

This is a list of crop plants pollinated by bees along with how much crop yield is improved by bee pollination. Most of them are pollinated in whole or part by honey bees and by the crop's natural pollinators such as bumblebees, orchard bees, squash bees, and solitary bees. Where the same plants have non-bee pollinators such as birds or other insects like flies, these are also indicated.

Pollination by insects is called entomophily. Entomophily is a form of plant pollination whereby pollen is distributed by insects, particularly bees, Lepidoptera (butterflies and moths), flies and beetles. Honey bees pollinate many plant species that are not native to their natural habitat but are often inefficient pollinators of such plants; if they are visiting ten different species of flower, only a tenth of the pollen they carry may be the right species. Other bees tend to favor one species at a time, therefore do most of the actual pollination.

Most staple food grains, like wheat, rice, soybean, maize and sorghum, need no insect help at all; they are wind or self-pollinated. Other staple food crops, like bananas and plantains, are propagated from cuttings, and produce fruit without pollination (parthenocarpy). Further, foods such as root vegetables and leafy vegetables will produce a useful food crop without pollination, though pollination may be required for the purpose of seed production or breeding.

Common name	Scientific name	Pollinator	Commercial product of pollination	Pollinator impact	Number of honey bee hives per acre	Geography of cultivation
Okra	Abelmoschus esculentus	Honey bees (incl. Apis cerana), solitary bees (Halictus spp.)	fruit	2-modest		temperate
Kiwifruit	Actinidia deliciosa	Honey bees, bumblebees, solitary bees	fruit	4-essential		
Potato	Solanum tuberosum	Bumblebees, solitary bees	seed	1-little		temperate, tropical
Onion	Allium cepa	Honey bees, solitary bees, blow flies	seed	1-little		temperate, tropical
Cashew	Anacardium occidentale	Honey bees, stingless bees, bumblebees, solitary bees (Centris tarsata), butterflies, flies, hummingbirds	nut	3-great		tropical
Celery	Apium graveolens	Honey bees, solitary bees, flies	seed			temperate
Strawberry tree	Arbutus unedo	Honey bees, bumblebees	fruit	2-modest		
Carambola, starfruit	Averrhoa carambola	Honey bees, stingless bees	fruit	3-great		tropical
Brazil nut	Bertholletia excelsa	Bumblebees, orchid bees, carpenter bees	nut	4-essential		equatorial
Beet	Beta vulgaris	Hover flies, honey bees, solitary bees	seed	1-little		temperate
Mustard	Brassica alba, Brassica hirta, Brassica nigra	Honey bees, solitary bees (Osmia cornifrons, Osmia lignaria)	seed	2-modest		temperate
Rapeseed	Brassica napus	Honey bees, solitary bees	seed	2-modest		temperate
Broccoli	Brassica oleracea cultivar	Honey bees, solitary bees	seed	1-little		temperate
Cauliflower	Brassica oleracea Botrytis Group	Honey bees, solitary bees	seed	1-little		temperate
Cabbage	Brassica oleracea Capitata Group	Honey bees, solitary bees	seed	1-little		temperate
Brussels sprouts	Brassica oleracea Gemmifera Group	Honey bees, solitary bees	seed	1-little		temperate
Chinese cabbage	Brassica rapa	Honey bees, solitary bees	seed	1-little		temperate
Turnip, canola	Brassica rapa	Honey bees, solitary bees (Andrena ilerda, Osmia cornifrons, Osmia lignaria, Halictus spp.), flies	seed	3-great	1	temperate
Pigeon pea, Cajan pea, Congo bean	Cajanus cajan	Honey bees, solitary bees (Megachile spp.), carpenter bees	seed	1-little		
Jack bean, horse bean, sword bean	Canavalia spp.	Solitary bees, carpenter bees (Xylocopa confusa)	seed	2-modest		
Chili pepper, red pepper, bell pepper, green pepper	Capsicum annuum, Capsicum frutescens	Honey bees, stingless bees (Melipona spp.), bumblebees, solitary bees, hover flies	fruit	1-little (pollinators important in green houses to increase fruit weight, but less in open fields)		
Papaya	Carica papaya	Honey bees, thrips, large sphinx moths, moths, butterflies	fruit	1-little		
Safflower	Carthamus tinctorius	Honey bees, solitary bees	seed	1-little		
Caraway	Carum carvi	Honey bees, solitary bees, flies	seed	2-modest	1	temperate
Chestnut	Castanea sativa	Honey bees, solitary bees	nut	2-modest		sub-tropical, Mediterranean or temperate
Watermelon	Citrullus lanatus	Honey bees, bumblebees, solitary bees	fruit	4-essential	1-3	temperate
Tangerine	Citrus tangerina	Honey bees, bumblebees	fruit	1-little		sub-tropical
Orange, grapefruit, tangelo	Citrus spp.	Honey bees, bumblebees	fruit	1-little		sub-tropical
Coconut	Cocos nucifera	Honey bees, stingless bees	nut	2-modest		tropical
Coffee	Coffea spp.	Honey bees, stingless bees, solitary bees	fruit	2-modest		tropical
Coriander	Coriandrum sativum	Honey bees, solitary bees	seed	3-great		
Crownvetch	Coronilla varia L.	Honey bees, bumblebees, solitary bees	seed (increased yield from pollinators)			temperate
Azarole	Crataegus azarolus	Honey bees, solitary bees	fruit	1-little		
Cantaloupe, melon	Cucumis melo L.	Honey bees, squash bees, bumblebees, solitary bees (Ceratina spp.)	fruit	4-essential	2-4	temperate
Cucumber	Cucumis sativus	Honey bees, squash bees, bumblebees, leafcutter bee (in greenhouse pollination), solitary bees (for some parthenocarpic gynoecious green house varieties pollination is detrimental to fruit quality)	fruit	3-great	1-2	temperate
Squash, pumpkin, gourd, marrow, zucchini	Cucurbita spp.	Honey bees, squash bees, bumblebees, solitary bees	fruit	4-essential	1	temperate
Guar bean, Goa bean	Cyamopsis tetragonoloba	Honey bees	seed	1-little		
Quince	Cydonia oblonga Mill.	Honey bees	fruit			temperate
Lemon	Citrus limon	Honey bees (also will often self-pollinate)	fruit			temperate
Lime	Citrus limetta	Honey bees (also will often self-pollinate)	fruit			temperate
Carrot	Daucus carota	Flies, solitary bees, honey bees	seed			temperate
Hyacinth bean	Dolichos spp.	Honey bees, solitary bees	seed	2-modest		
Longan	Dimocarpus longan	Honey bees, stingless bees		1-little		
Persimmon	Diospyros kaki, Diospyros virginiana	Honey bees, bumblebees, solitary bees	fruit	1-little		
Cardamom	Elettaria cardamomum	Honey bees, solitary bees		3-great		
Loquat	Eriobotrya japonica	Honey bees, bumblebees	fruit	3-great		
Buckwheat	Fagopyrum esculentum	Honey bees, solitary bees	seed	3-great	1	temperate
Feijoa	Feijoa sellowiana	Honey bees, solitary bees	fruit	3-great		tropical
Fennel	Foeniculum vulgare	Honey bees, solitary bees, flies	seed	3-great		temperate
Strawberry	Fragaria spp.	Honey bees, stingless bees, bumblebees, solitary bees (Halictus spp.), hover flies	fruit	2-modest	1	temperate
Cotton	Gossypium spp.	Honey bees, bumblebees, solitary bees	seed, fiber	2-modest		
Sunflower	Helianthus annuus	Bumblebees, solitary bees, honey bees	seed	2-modest	1	temperate
Flax	Linum usitatissimum	Honey bees, bumblebees, solitary bees	seed	1-little		temperate
Lychee	Litchi chinensis	Honey bees, flies	fruit	1-little		
Lupine	Lupinus angustifolius	Honey bees, bumblebees, solitary bees	seed			temperate
Macadamia	Macadamia ternifolia	Honey bees, stingless bees (Tetragonula carbonaria), solitary bees (Homalictus spp.), wasps, butterflies	nut	4-essential		tropical
Acerola	Malpighia glabra	Honey bees, solitary bees	fruit (minor commercial value)			
Apple	Malus domestica or Malus sylvestris	Honey bees, orchard mason bee, bumblebees, solitary bees (Andrena spp., Halictus spp., Osmia spp., Anthophora spp.), hover flies (Eristalis cerealis, Eristalis tenax)	fruit	3-great	1, 2 semi dwarf, 3 dwarf	temperate
Mammee apple	Mammea americana	Bees	fruit	2-modest		tropical
Mango	Mangifera indica	Honey bees, stingless bees, bumblebees, flies, ants, wasps, stinkbugs, beetles, flower thrips, fruit bats, wind	fruit	3-great		sub-tropical
Alfalfa	Medicago sativa	Alfalfa leafcutter bee, alkali bee, honey bees	seed		1	temperate
Rambutan	Nephelium lappaceum	Honey bees, stingless bees, flies	fruit	1-little		tropical
prickly pear	Opuntia spp.	Bumblebees, solitary bees	fruit	2-modest		
Sainfoin	Onobrychis spp.	Honey bees, solitary bees	seed			temperate
Passion fruit	Passiflora edulis	Carpenter bees, solitary bees, bumblebees, hummingbirds	fruit	4-essential		tropical
Avocado	Persea americana	Stingless bees, solitary bees, honey bees	fruit	3-great		
Lima bean, kidney bean, haricot bean, adzuki bean, mungo bean, string bean, green bean	Phaseolus spp.	Honey bees, solitary bees	fruit, seed	1-little		
Scarlet runner bean	Phaseolus coccineus L.	Bumblebees, honey bees, solitary bees, thrips	seed			
Allspice	Pimenta dioica	Honey bees, solitary bees (Halictus spp., Exomalopsis spp., Ceratina spp.)	fruit	3-great		
Apricot	Prunus armeniaca	Honey bees, bumblebees, solitary bees, flies	fruit	3-great	1	temperate
Sweet cherry	Prunus avium spp.	Honey bees, bumblebees, solitary bees, flies	fruit	3-great		temperate
Sour cherry	Prunus cerasus	Honey bees, bumblebees, solitary bees, flies	fruit	3-great		temperate
Plum, greengage, mirabelle, sloe	Prunus domestica, Prunus spinosa	Honey bees, bumblebees, solitary bees, flies	fruit	3-great	1	temperate
Almond	Prunus dulcis, Prunus amygdalus, or Amygdalus communis	Honey bees, bumblebees, solitary bees (Osmia cornuta), flies	nut	3-great	2-3	temperate
Peach, nectarine	Prunus persica	Honey bees, bumblebees, solitary bees, flies	fruit	3-great	1	temperate
Guava	Psidium guajava	Honey bees, stingless bees, bumblebees, solitary bees (Lasioglossum spp.)	fruit	2-modest		tropical
Pomegranate	Punica granatum	Honey bees, solitary bees, beetles	fruit	2-modest		
Pear	Pyrus communis	Honey bees, bumblebees, solitary bees, hover flies (Eristalis spp.)	fruit	3-great	1	temperate
Black currant, red currant	Ribes nigrum, Ribes rubrum	Honey bees, bumblebees, solitary bees	fruit	2-modest		temperate
Rose hips, dogroses	Rosa spp.	Honey bees, bumblebees, carpenter bees, solitary bees, hover flies		3-great		temperate
Boysenberry	Rubus spp.	Honey bees, bumblebees, solitary bees	fruit			temperate
Raspberry	Rubus idaeus	Honey bees, bumblebees, solitary bees, hover flies (Eristalis spp.)	fruit	3-great	1	temperate
Blackberry	Rubus fruticosus	Honey bees, bumblebees, solitary bees, hover flies (Eristalis spp.)	fruit	3-great		temperate
Elderberry	Sambucus nigra	Honey bees, solitary bees, flies, longhorn beetles	fruit	2-modest		temperate
Sesame	Sesamum indicum	Honey bees, solitary bees, wasps, flies	seed	2-modest		
Eggplant	Solanum melongena	Bumblebees, solitary bees	fruit	2-modest (pollinators important in green houses, but less in open fields)		temperate
Naranjilla	Solanum quitoense	Bumblebees, solitary bees	fruit	3-great		tropical
Rowanberry	Sorbus aucuparia	Honey bees, solitary bees, bumblebees, hover flies	fruit	4-essential		temperate
Service tree	Sorbus domestica	Bees, flies	fruit	2-modest		
Hog plum	Spondias spp.	Honey bees, stingless bees (Melipona spp.)	fruit	1-little		
Tamarind	Tamarindus indica	Honey bees (incl. Apis dorsata)	fruit	1-little		
Clover (not all species)	Trifolium spp.	Honey bees, bumblebees, solitary bees	seed		1	temperate
White clover	Trifolium alba	Honey bees, bumblebees, solitary bees	seed		1	temperate
Alsike clover	Trifolium hybridum L.	Honey bees, bumblebees, solitary bees	seed		1	temperate
Crimson clover	Trifolium incarnatum	Honey bees, bumblebees, solitary bees	seed		1	
Red clover	Trifolium pratense	Honey bees, bumblebees, solitary bees	seed		1	temperate
Arrowleaf clover	Trifolium vesiculosum	Honey bees, bumblebees, solitary bees	seed		1	temperate
Blueberry	Vaccinium spp.	Alfalfa leafcutter bees, southeastern blueberry bee, bumblebees (Bombus impatiens), solitary bees (Anthophora pilipes, Colletes spp., Osmia ribifloris, Osmia lignaria), honey bees	fruit	3-great	3-4	temperate
Cranberry	Vaccinium oxycoccus, Vaccinium macrocarpon	Bumblebees (Bombus affinis), solitary bees (Megachile addenda, alfalfa leafcutter bees), honey bees	fruit		3	temperate
Broad bean	Vicia faba	Honey bees, bumblebees, solitary bees	seed	2-modest		
Vetch	Vicia spp.	Honey bees, bumblebees, solitary bees	seed			temperate
Cowpea, black-eyed pea, blackeye bean	Vigna unguiculata	Honey bees, bumblebees, solitary bees	seed	1-little		
Karite, shea	Vitellaria paradoxa	Honey bees	nut	2-modest		temperate
Tomato	Solanum lycopersicum	Bumblebees, solitary bees (Halictus spp.)	fruit	2-modest (important for commercial crop yield)		temperate, tropical
Grape	Vitis spp.	Honey bees, solitary bees, flies	fruit	1-little		temperate
Jujube	Ziziphus jujuba	Honey bees, solitary bees, flies, beetles, wasps	fruit	2-modest		

== See also ==
- Fruit tree pollination
- Pollination management
- Pollinator
- Pollen source
- List of Northern American nectar sources for honey bees
- Forage (honey bee)
- List of honey plants
- Buckwheat
