= Fruit tree pollination =

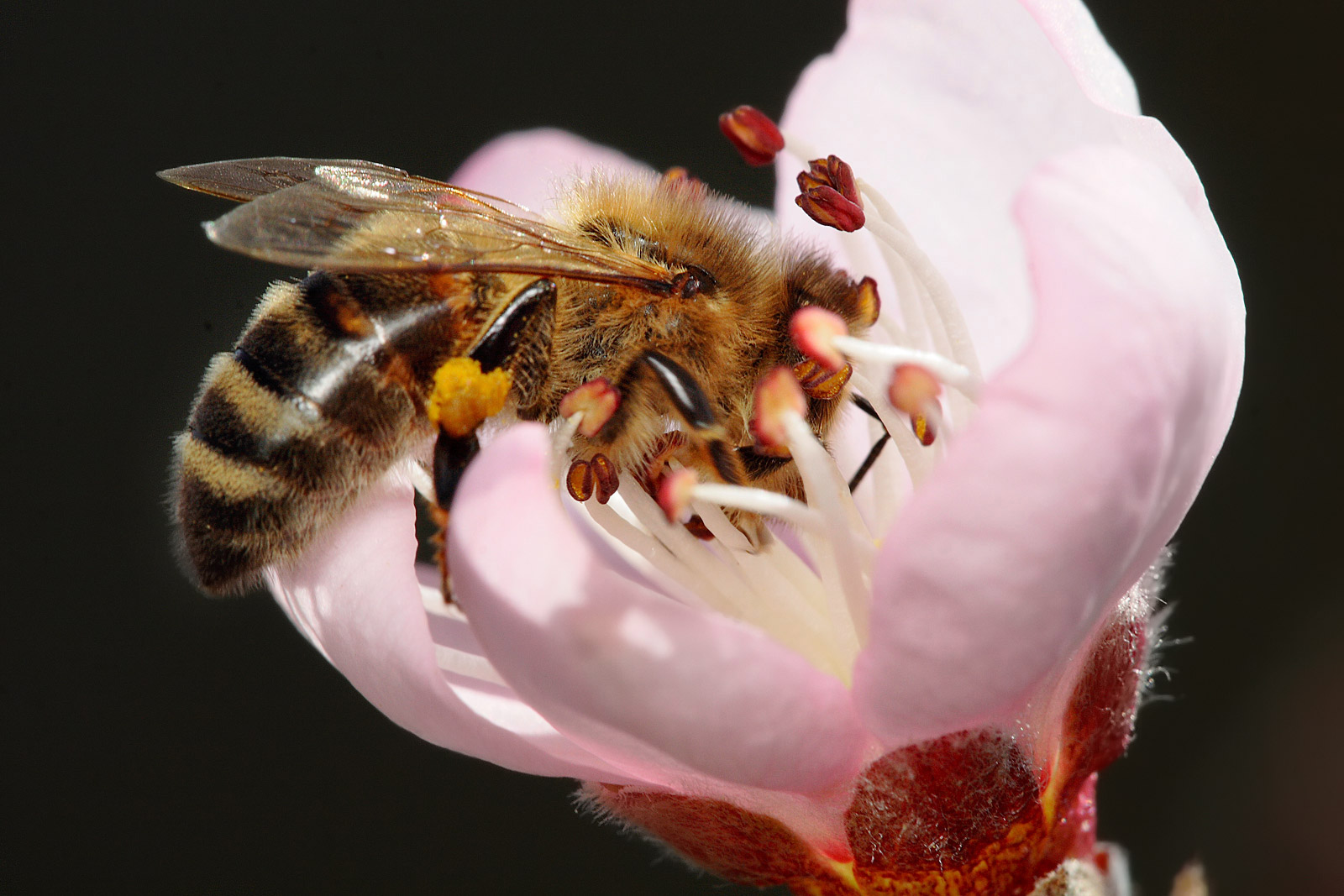
A European honey bee pollinates a peach flower while collecting nectar.

Pollination of fruit trees is required to produce seeds with surrounding fruit. It is the process of moving pollen from the anther to the stigma, either in the same flower or in another flower. Some tree species, including many fruit trees, do not produce fruit from self-pollination, so pollinizer trees are planted in orchards.

The pollination process requires a carrier for the pollen, which can be animal, wind, or human intervention (by hand-pollination or by using a pollen sprayer). Cross pollination produces seeds with a different genetic makeup from the parent plants; such seeds may be created deliberately as part of a selective breeding program for fruit trees with desired attributes. Trees that are cross-pollinated or pollinated via an insect pollinator produce more fruit than trees with flowers that just self-pollinate. In fruit trees, bees are an essential part of the pollination process for the formation of fruit.

Pollination of fruit trees around the world has been highly studied for hundreds of years. Much is known about fruit tree pollination in temperate climates, but much less is known about fruit tree pollination in tropical climates. Fruits from temperate climates include apples, pears, plums, peaches, cherries, berries, grapes, and nuts which are considered dry fruits. Fruits from tropical climates include bananas, pineapples, papayas, passion fruit, avocado, mango, and members of the genus Citrus.

== Temperate fruits ==
=== Apples ===
Most apple plants/trees are self-incompatible, that is, they do not produce fruit when pollinated from a flower of the same tree or from another tree of the same cultivar, and must be cross pollinated. A few are described as "self-fertile" and are capable of self-pollination, although even those tend to carry larger crops when cross pollinated from a suitable pollenizer. A relatively small number of cultivars are "triploid", meaning that they provide almost no viable pollen for themselves or other apple trees. Apples that can pollinate one another are grouped by the time they flower so cross-pollinators are in bloom at the same time. Pollination management is an important component of apple culture. Before planting, it is important to arrange for pollenizers – varieties of apple or crabapple that provide plentiful, viable and compatible pollen. Orchard blocks may alternate rows of compatible varieties, or may plant crabapple trees, or graft on limbs of crabapple. Some varieties produce very little pollen, or the pollen is sterile, so these are not good pollenizers. Good-quality nurseries have pollenizer compatibility lists. Growers with old orchard blocks of single varieties sometimes provide bouquets of crabapple blossoms in drums or pails in the orchard for pollenizers. Home growers with a single tree and no other variety in the neighborhood can do the same on a smaller scale.

During the bloom each season, commercial apple growers usually provide pollinators to carry the pollen. Honeybee hives are most commonly used in the United States, and arrangements may be made with a commercial beekeeper who supply hives for a fee. Honeybees of the genus Apis are the most common pollinator for apple trees, although members of the genera Andrena, Bombus, Halictus, and Osmia pollinate apple trees in the wild. Solitary bees or wild bees such as ground-nesting mining bees (Andrena) may play a far bigger role in pollination than at one time suspected, and are alternative pollinators in orchards. Bumble bees are sometimes present in orchards, but not usually in enough quantity to be significant pollinators; in the home garden with only a few trees, their role may be much greater. Apple growers also rely on several species of wild bees for pollination in their orchard.

Increasingly Orchard bees (spring mason bees, genus Osmia) are being used in fruit tree pollination. According to British writer Christopher O'Toole in his book The Red Mason Bee, Osmia rufa is a much more efficient pollinator of orchard crops (in Europe) than honey bees. Both O. rufa and O. cornuta are used in Europe, while in western North America, the "Blue Orchard Bee" (Osmia lignaria, more black than blue in color) is a proven orchard pollinator. In Japan, the Japanese Orchard Bee—the hornfaced bee, Osmia cornifrons—provides up to 80% of the apple pollination. Beyond Japan, Osmia cornifrons is also used increasingly in the eastern US, because like other mason bees it is up to 100 times more efficient than the honeybee—a mere 600 hornfaced bees being required per hectare, as opposed to tens of thousands of honeybees. Home growers may find these more acceptable in suburban locations because they rarely sting.

Symptoms of inadequate pollination are small and misshapen apples, and slowness to ripen. The seeds can be counted to evaluate pollination. Well-pollinated apples have best quality, and will have seven to ten seeds. Apples with fewer than three seeds will usually not mature and will drop from the trees in the early summer. Inadequate pollination can result from either a lack of pollinators or pollenizers, or from poor pollinating weather at bloom time. Multiple bee visits are usually required to deliver sufficient grains of pollen to accomplish complete pollination.

=== Pears ===
Like apples, pears are self-incompatible and need to attract insects in order to be pollinated and produce fruit. One notable difference from apples is that pear blossoms are much less attractive to honeybees due to their pale coloring and light odor. Bees may abandon the pear blossoms to visit dandelions or a nearby apple orchard. The majority of pollinators of pear trees are honey bees, although pears are also visited by blow flies and hoverflies. In some areas, such as the Emilia-Romagna area of Italy, honeybees could not be used to pollinate pears due to the spread of fireblight in the 1990s, and Osmia cornuta were used as pollinators instead. A way to combat the low attraction of honey bees to pear blossoms is to use bee attractants to entice the bees to pollinate the flowers. Bee attractants may include pheromones that mimic the brood pheromone or the juvenile pheromone, or other attractants. There are also other methods for attracting honey bees to pear blossoms. One is saturation pollination, that is to stock so many bees that all area blossoms are worked regardless of the attractiveness to the bees. Another method is to delay the movement of the beehives into the orchards until there is about 30 percent bloom. The bees are moved into the orchard during the night and will usually visit the pear blossoms for a few hours until they discover the richer nectar sources. The recommended number of hives per acre is one.

=== Plums and prunes ===
Most Asian plums require a second variety for cross-pollination, whereas most European plums are self-fertile. European plums that dry well are also called prunes, the common name for the dry fruit. Several of the Asian plums bloom early and pollinator management is similar to apricots. However the fruiting wood especially of Asian plums can be brittle and over-pollination requires aggressive thinning of fruits.

=== Apricots ===
Apricots are botanically similar to almonds and like almonds they can bloom early, making pollinator management similar except that a tree can overcrop if the fruit is not thinned.

=== Peaches and Nectarines ===
Most peaches and nectarines are self fertile and thus require fewer pollinators than apples and pears.

=== Cherries ===
Pie cherries, also called sour cherries, are self-fertile. In some varieties, fruit yield could increased by utilizing pollinators. Most sweet cherries need a second variety for pollination, and even self-fertile varies have improved fruit-set with a second variety. Pie cherries can pollinate sweet cherries. Cherries do not need thinning.

=== Figs ===
Some figs produce fruit without pollination. Figs that are pollinated rely on fig wasps.

== Temperate nuts ==
=== Almonds ===
The blossoms of most California [Almond] varieties are self-incompatible, requiring cross-pollination with other varieties to produce a crop. The single most important factor determining a good yield is pollination during the bloom period. More than a million colonies of honey bees are placed in California Almond orchards at the beginning of the bloom period to pollinate the crop. California beekeepers alone cannot supply this critical need, which is why honey bees travel across the country to the San Joaqin Valley each year. Although the recommended number of hives per acre is 2 to 3, due to the high demand in conjunction with the reduced availability of commercial beehives, many almond growers have to make do with a lower hive density during pollination. These growers started using semiochemical formulations, like SPLAT Bloom, to compensate for the low hive density. SPLAT Bloom manipulates the behavior of the bees, inciting them to spend more time foraging, and thus pollinating flowers in the entire almond orchard (increasing pollination and fruit set), not only close to the hive.

Research into self-fertile almonds has led to the development of several almond varieties that do not need a pollinator tree. Working from an old Spanish variety, "Tuono", researchers in 2008 started making available new self-fertile varieties that more closely match the qualities of the popular "Nonpareil" almond—including varieties "Lone Star" and "Independence". While self-fertile trees do not require pollen from a second tree variety for fruit / nut set, they still depend upon insect pollination for good production. Almond growers with self-fertile almonds report excellent nut set with half (or less) the number of bees in the field.

=== Wind-pollinated nuts ===
Hazelnuts (filberts), walnuts, pecans, and chestnuts are all wind-pollinated temperate-zone nuts. Mostly these wind-pollinated nuts are selected varieties that need two different varieties (and favorable winds) for cross-pollination. Insects and birds may visit and consume the pollen, but are not a factor in pollination.

Edible seeds from wind-pollinated coniferous trees such as pine, ginkgo, and monkey-puzzle trees are also harvested and the seeds are colloquially called nuts.

== Tropical fruits and nuts ==
=== Citrus ===
Many citrus cultivars are seedless and are produced parthenocarpically without pollination. Some cultivars may be capable of producing fruit either way, having seeds in the segments, if pollinated, and no seeds if not. Citrus that requires pollination may be self-compatible, thus pollen must be moved only a short distance from the anther to the stigma by a pollinator. Some citrus, such as Meyer Lemons, are popular container plants. When these bloom indoors, they often suffer from blossom drop because no pollinators have access. Hand pollination by a human pollinator is a solution.

A few citrus, including some tangelos and tangerines, are self-incompatible, and require cross pollination. Pollinizers must be planned when groves are planted. Managed honeybee hives at bloom time are often used to ensure adequate pollination.

=== Papayas ===
Most varieties of papaya are dioecious, having both male and female flowers on separate plants. Plants of each type must be present for these to produce fruit. Some papaya plants are capable of self-pollination, producing flowers that are either female or hermaphrodite with both male and female parts on the same flower. Hawaiian and Brazilian papayas and nearly half of those produced in Australia are able to set fruit without the need of staminate plants. A fully developed fruit may contain 1,000 seeds so well over 1,000 grains of pollen must be received by a receptive stigma. An exact list of actors involved in natural papaya pollination does not exist. Large insects play an important role in most regions with hawkmoths, sphinx moths and possibly hummingbirds as primary pollinators. Honey bees are attracted to nectar and pollen from the staminate and hermaphrodite papaya flowers, but narrow tubes and deep flowers may limit the effectiveness of bees as primary pollinators. Even so, pollen requirements for healthy and consistent fruit motivate growers to locate honeybees within their groves to pollinate in any capacity. Early researchers believed wind and gravity played significant roles pollinating this tropical fruit but modern studies fail to confirm either one.

=== Passion fruit ===
Most edible passion fruit varieties are self fertile. Since each flower is only open for 1–2 days and may not get the chance to be pollinated by insects, fruit set can improved by hand pollinating.

=== Avocados ===
Most avocados are pollinated using bees. There is often not enough local pollinators in order to pollinate the large amount of avocado trees found in orchards, so beehives must be transported from elsewhere. Some people consider migratory beekeeping to be exploitative towards bees.

=== Mangoes ===
Mangoes are usually self pollinating and also grown by grafting
