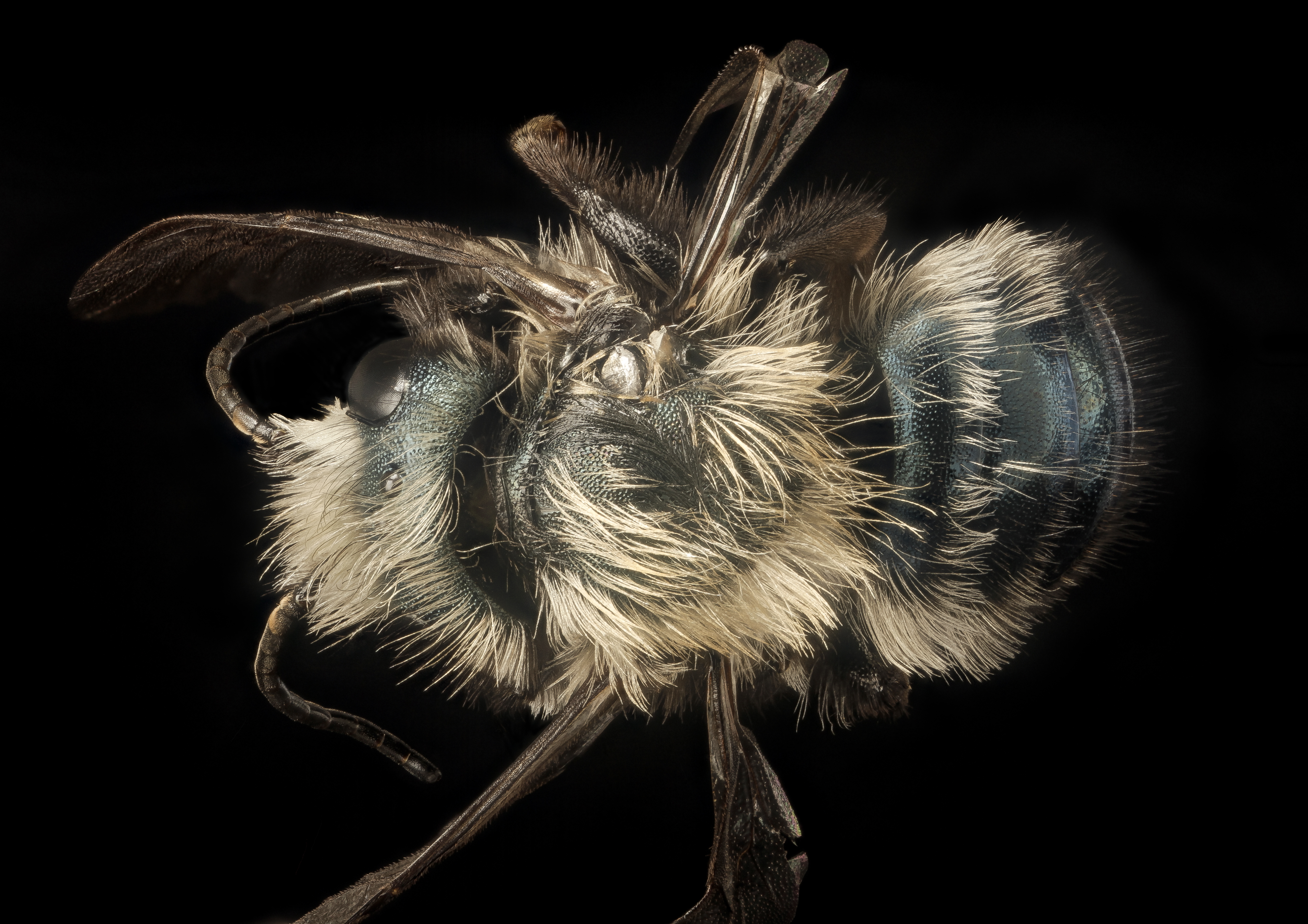

Scientific classification
- Domain: Eukaryota
- Kingdom: Animalia
- Phylum: Arthropoda
- Class: Insecta
- Order: Hymenoptera
- Family: Megachilidae
- Genus: Osmia
- Species: O. californica

Binomial name
- Osmia californica Cresson, 1864

= Osmia californica =

Species of bee

Osmia californica is a megachilid bee, or mason bee. Native to North America, the mason bees are important pollinators, with O. california pollinating over 33 genera from 13 plant families. O. californica generally emerges a little later in the spring than the better known orchard mason bee (O. lignaria). Like the orchard mason bee, O. californica is a solitary nester, usually constructing nests with leaf pulp providing a partition within the nest to protect the egg chamber.
