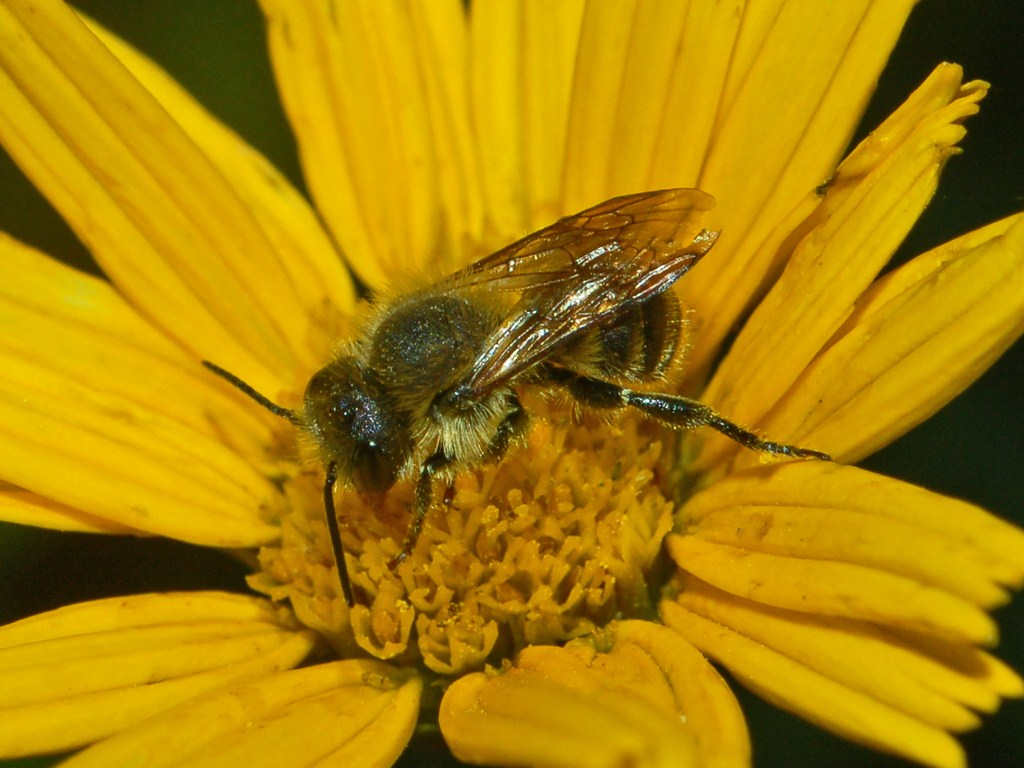

Scientific classification
- Domain: Eukaryota
- Kingdom: Animalia
- Phylum: Arthropoda
- Class: Insecta
- Order: Hymenoptera
- Family: Megachilidae
- Genus: Osmia
- Species: O. latreillei

Binomial name
- Osmia latreillei (Spinola, 1806)

Synonyms
- Megachile latreillei Spinola, 1806; Osmia nasidens Latreille, 1811

= Osmia latreillei =

Species of bee

Osmia latreillei is a species of mason bee belonging to the family Megachilidae subfamily Megachilinae.

== Subspecies ==
Subspecies include:

- Osmia latreillei iberoafricana Peters, 1975
- Osmia latreillei latreillei (Spinola, 1806)

== Distribution ==
This species is mainly found in central and southern Europe including countries such as France, Germany, Switzerland, Italy, Greece, and Spain. Occasionally, these bees have also been found in North Africa and the Middle East.

== Biology ==
Females of this species dig tunnels in the ground, where they create cells at the tunnel's end. These cells are stocked with pollens, and eggs are laid in each one. Once the eggs hatch, the larvae feed directly on the pollen grains for about thirty days. The bees overwinter in the stage of prepupae. In the spring, they enter the pupal stage, while the adults emerge by the end of March. The flying season typically lasts from April through July.

The bees are oligolectic, gathering pollen only from Asteraceae species. However, adults have been observed feeding on a variety of plants from different families, including Reichardia picroides (Asteraceae), Echium angustifolium (Boraginaceae), Vicia villosa (Leguminosae), Euphorbia spp. (Euphorbiaceae), Salvia verticillata (Labiatae), Rosmarinus officinalis (Labiatae) and Morina persica (Dipsacaceae).
