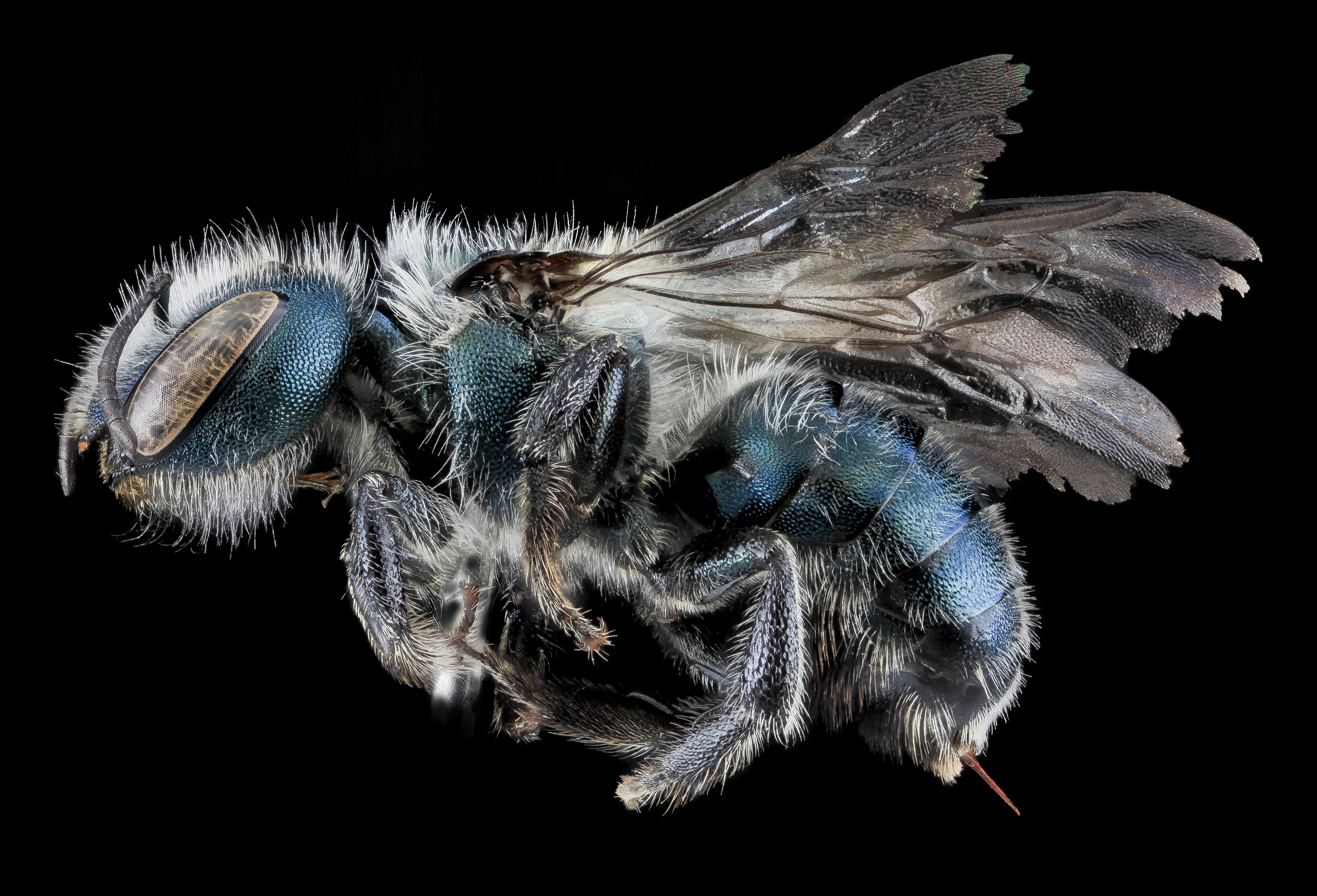
- Osmia atriventris, female

Scientific classification
- Domain: Eukaryota
- Kingdom: Animalia
- Phylum: Arthropoda
- Class: Insecta
- Order: Hymenoptera
- Family: Megachilidae
- Genus: Osmia
- Species: O. atriventris

Binomial name
- Osmia atriventris Cresson, 1864

= Osmia atriventris =

Species of bee

Osmia atriventris, sometimes referred to as the Maine blueberry bee, is a megachilid bee native to eastern North America from Nova Scotia to Alberta in the north, and Iowa to Georgia in the south. This solitary bee normally gathers pollen from many different flowers, but will pollinate blueberries, and is sometimes used commercially for this purpose.
