= Osmia avosetta =

Scientific classification
- Kingdom: Animalia
- Phylum: Arthropoda
- Clade: Pancrustacea
- Class: Insecta
- Order: Hymenoptera
- Family: Megachilidae
- Genus: Osmia
- Species: O. avosetta

Binomial name
- Osmia avosetta (Warncke, 1988)

Species of bee

Osmia avosetta is a species of mason bee. It is solitary by nature, and is notable for its distinctive use of flower petals to construct nests for its larvae.

== Nesting ==
The female O. avosetta digs shallow tunnels in the ground consisting of one or two chambers, each of which it then covers with flower petals glued together with mud. It then places larval food in each chamber and seals it with soil and by folding the petals over. The cell hardens to form protection for the larva against predation and weather. This behavior was first observed on the same day in 2009, by two research groups working separately in the mountains of Turkey and Iran. Both teams co-published their findings.

== Distribution ==
The species is found in Southwest Asia. It was first identified in Turkey, and has also been observed in Iran, Syria and Jordan.

In August 2019 an individual of O. avosetta - as well as their nest, which was made from Hydrangea petals - was discovered in a conservatory in Bristol, England. The bee is thought to have arrived in the UK in holiday luggage from Dalaman, Turkey. Once notified, the British Beekeepers Association said the bee had the potential to harm native species. DEFRA put a kill order on the bee, however, the family who discovered its nest said they were unable to catch it.

== In popular culture ==
An exemplar of O. avosetta appears in the 17th episode of the 1st season of the TV series Elementary.
