= Osmia xanthomelana =

Conservation status
- Least Concern (IUCN 3.1)

Scientific classification
- Kingdom: Animalia
- Phylum: Arthropoda
- Class: Insecta
- Order: Hymenoptera
- Family: Megachilidae
- Genus: Osmia
- Species: O. xanthomelana

Binomial name
- Osmia xanthomelana (Kirby, 1802)

Synonyms
- Apis xanthomelana Kirby, 1802; Osmia fuciformis, Latreille, 1811; Osmia chrysomelina Panzer, 1811; Osmia atricapilla Curtis, 1828; Osmia pyrenaica Lepeletier, 1841

Species of bee

Osmia xanthomelana, the large mason bee, is a species of mason bee in the genus Osmia. It has a wide distribution in the Palearctic but it is rare wherever it occurs and, for example, in Great Britain it has a highly restricted distribution, although in the past it was a little more widespread there.

== Description ==
Osmia xanthomelana is a medium-sized bee, measuring 12–13mm in length with a stocky, robust structure. The main colour is black but it has golden to brown hairs which cover the face and thorax becoming sparser and paler on the abdomen.

== Distribution ==
Osmia xanthomelana is widely distributed throughout the Palearctic but it is apparently rare wherever it occurs. In Great Britain it is currently found only in two locations on the Llŷn Peninsula, in Gwynedd, Wales.

== Habitat ==
Osmia xanthomelana is found around eroded cliffs of softer rocks such as clay and chalk, among landslips, dunes and in semi-natural and unimproved grassland where its food plant bird's-foot trefoil occurs. To be suitable a site should also have a supply of freshwater from seepages which is needed for the bee to construct its cells for breeding.

== Biology ==
In Great Britain male Osmia xanthomelana are recorded from April and the females are slightly later in May with both sexes being recorded up to July. The nests are usually dug out in south-east facing eroded banks, occasionally burrows from previous seasons are reused after being cleaned out by the female. The females collect freshwater from seepages around the base of the cliff to make mud which is then combined with grit to the construct the nest cells. There are normally five or six cells per nest. The cells may be stood in a cluster with their bases in the ground if a burrow is not used. The cells are each sealed with a flat lid made of the same material as they are constructed. The cells are provisioned with pollen from bird's-foot trefoil although O. xanthomelana will nectar on a variety of plants such as horseshoe vetch, bramble and bugle. The wasp Sapyga quinquepunctata is known to kleptoparasitise this bee, its larvae feeding on the stored pollen.

== Conservation ==
Osmia xanthomelana was known from around 28 scattered sites in Great Britain as far north as Tyneside but it was thought to have been reduced to a single site on the Isle of Wight by the 1990s, from which no bees have been recorded since the 1990s. However, two sites were discovered on the Llŷn Peninsula in Wales in 1998 and 1999. It is thought that individual sites can be lost due to erosion and sudden landslips and this is what destroyed the Isle of Wight site. The forage plant of O. xanthomelana, bird's-foot trefoil, is sensitive to over or under grazing and these can result in the loss of the plants during the colony cycle of the bee. It is also thought that climate change and agricultural run-off from nearby intensive farmland are also threats to the bee populations. Conservation measures have included clearing invasive vegetation from banks and the creation of new banks.
