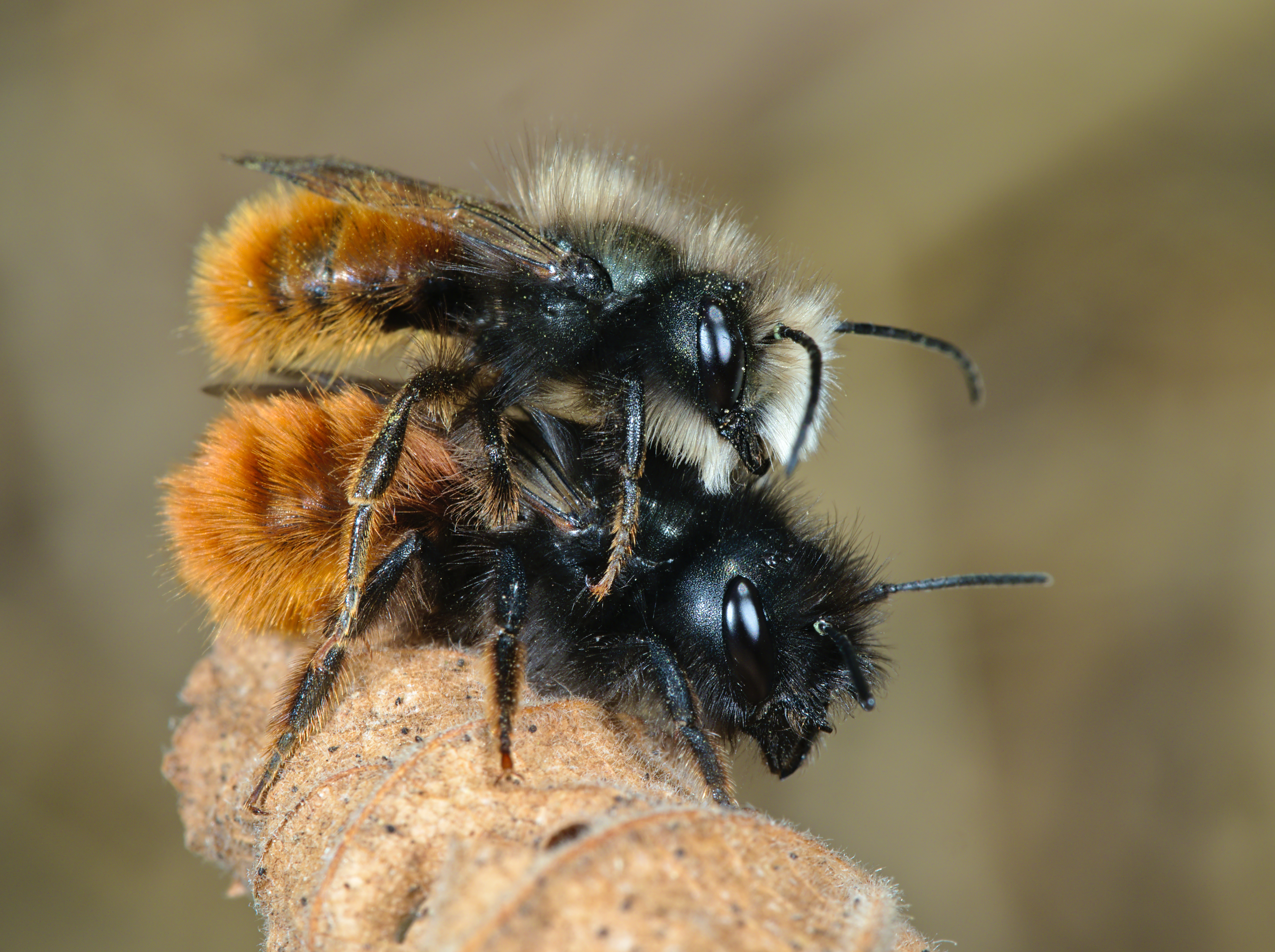

Scientific classification
- Kingdom: Animalia
- Phylum: Arthropoda
- Class: Insecta
- Order: Hymenoptera
- Family: Megachilidae
- Genus: Osmia
- Species: O. cornuta

Binomial name
- Osmia cornuta (Latreille, 1805)

Synonyms
- Megachile cornuta Latreille, 1805; Osmia divergens Friese, 1920; Osmia neoregaena Mavromoustakis, 1938

= Osmia cornuta =

Species of bee

Osmia cornuta, the European orchard bee, is a species of bee in the genus Osmia.

== Description ==
10–15 mm. Males with conspicuously hairy faces. Females are unmistakable due to the black hair on the head and thorax, the rust-red hairy abdomen and the horned head shield.

== Range ==
Osmia cornuta is known in North Africa from Algeria, Tunisia and Egypt. In Eurasia from Portugal through southern and central Europe, Asia Minor and the Caucasus to Southeast Kazakhstan; northward to the North German Plain, Central Poland, Northern Ukraine and Voronezh; south to Sicily, Crete, Syria and Northern Iran. The evidence from Primorye is based on an error. The species was introduced to the United States for pollination purposes, but there are no reports of viable populations in the wild. In the ssp. divergens Friese, 1920 occurs from Iran to Central Asia; in the ssp. neoregaena Mavromoustakis, 1938 in the Aegean Islands and Cyprus; in the ssp. quasirufa Peters, 1978 from the Turkish Aegean coast to the Caucasus and north-west Iran as well as (isolated?) in Egypt. Recorded from all federal states in Germany and Austria with the exception of Schleswig-Holstein. In Germany more common in the south than in the north. Mainly in warmer locations below 500 m, very occasionally also higher (e.g. Freudenstadt in the Black Forest, 728 m). It is increasingly being brought into areas where the species did not naturally occur through the trade in cocoons. In Switzerland there is no evidence from the main Alpine ridge and the north side of the Alps, in the Engadin it occurred only historically, otherwise almost everywhere recent records. The first record of this bee in Great Britain occurred in 2017.

== Habitat ==
Since the species needs an early, mild spring, it occurs predominantly in the settlement area, where the corresponding microclimate and the usually rich supply of early-blooming herbs and trees meet their needs. Probably the most characteristic synanthropic species in southwest Germany as it can be found even in the centers of large cities (e.g. Stuttgart, Karlsruhe, Freiburg), where it swarms around the primroses and hyacinths offered for sale. In the settlement area, the species chooses almost exclusively large structures, especially house walls for nesting. Where the species occurs in warmer locations outside of built-up areas, it only colonizes sun-exposed loess and clay walls. This and the observation of the behavior when looking for a nesting site lead to the conclusion that the original nesting sites of this species were steep walls on river banks, where it nested in abandoned brood cells of Anthophora plumipes. From the lowlands to the montane elevation.

== Ecology ==
Adults are on wing in one generation from February / March to May / June. The males of Osmia cornuta often appear as early as mid-March, usually when Scilla begins to bloom, i.e. before Osmia bicornis. The main nesting activity of the females, which are already active in the morning hours at temperatures of approx. 10 °C, is between mid-March and early May, and in warmer years between early March and mid-April. Nesting activity from mid-April, with a maximum in average years at the end of April / beginning of May. Wintering takes place as an imago in a cocoon.

Osmia cornuta is extremely polylectic. So far, the use of the pollen of the 14 plant families Aceraceae, Aquifoliaceae, Asparagaceae, Asteraceae, Berberidaceae, Brassicaceae, Fabaceae, Fagaceae, Uliaceae, Papaveraceae, Primulaceae, Ranunculaceae, Rosaceae and Salicaceae has been proven. These pollen sources have been observed: Ilex aquifolium, Scilla siberica, Muscari armeniacum, Taraxacum officinale, Epimedium pinnatum, Brassica napus, Trifolium pratense, Trifolium repens, Quercus spec., Tulipa gesneriana, Corydalis cava, Corydalis solida, Corydalis lutea, Primula elatior, Ranunculus acris, Ranunculus repens, Prunus spinosa, Prunus armeniaca, Prunus cerasus, Prunus cerasifera, Pyrus communis, Malus domestica, Crataegus monogyna, Salix caprea, Salix purpurea, Acer platanoides, Acer pseudoplatanus, Acer campestre.

If plants have a high flower density in the immediate vicinity of the nesting areas, the females usually behave in a constant manner. In the pollen loads and brood cells from southern Germany highest proportions were represented by Prunus, Salix and Acer, in France Prunus predominated. In Spain, Marquez et al. (1994) also found Prunus as the dominant pollen type in pollen loads, but the females in apple plantations mainly collected malus pollen when it was particularly easily accessible. Eckhardt et al. (2014) found mixtures of pollen from 2-6 plant families in the pollen loads. Osmia cornuta is used in some countries as a pollinator in almond and pome fruit plantations.

Osmia cornuta lack the pollen baskets on their hind tibiae; they do not produce honey, but they do use the pollen and nectar to stock their nests when they are ready.

Osmia cornuta does not live in colonies in hives like bumble bees and honey bees. It nests in existing cavities of various shapes and sizes: cracks in walls, holes in plastering, drainage pipes and cracks in window frames, recesses in stones, old nests of fur bees (Anthophora plumipes, Anthophora fulvitarsis) and of Delta unguiculata. Also colonizes nesting aids (e.g. holes in wood, bamboo cane, preferred inner diameter 8–9 mm. Length 20–25 cm), provided these are attached directly to the house wall or other larger areas. The nests are mostly linear structures with up to 12 brood cells. In larger cavities, however, the brood cells are occasionally built together irregularly. Moist earth or loam collected at the edges of the water is preferably used as building material. When the ground is very dry on the surface, numerous females often gather in the same place, looking for cracks in the ground or digging holes several centimeters deep in the ground in order to get to moist building material. The mortar is mixed with saliva.

Osmia cornuta is host to several parasites. Cuckoo bees have not yet been observed. The wasps Chrysis ignita and Chrysura simplex, Leucospis dorsigera, Melittobia acasta, Monodontomerus aeneus and Monodontomerus obscurus, the flies Anthrax anthrax and Cacoxenus indagator, the beetle Sitaris muralis as well as the mite Chaetodactylus osmiae, were known as breeding parasites.

== Etymology ==
From Latin, "cornuta" = "horned, two-pointed"; because of the two horn-like appendages on the female's clypeus.

== Taxonomy ==
Subgenus Osmia PANZER, 1806
