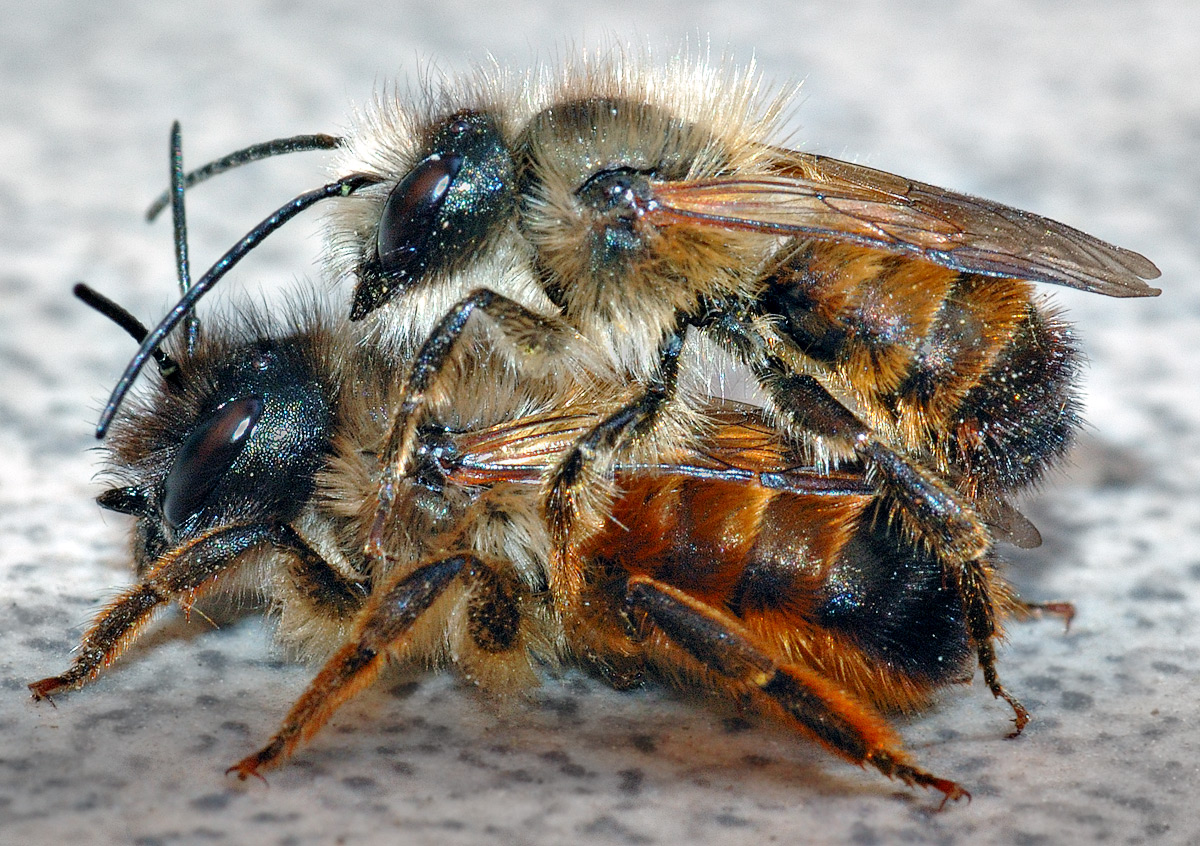
- Osmia bicornis

Scientific classification
- Kingdom: Animalia
- Phylum: Arthropoda
- Clade: Pancrustacea
- Class: Insecta
- Order: Hymenoptera
- Family: Megachilidae
- Subfamily: Megachilinae
- Tribe: Osmiini
- Genus: Osmia; Panzer, 1806

Type species
- Apis bicornis Linnaeus, 1758

Species
- >300 species, including: Osmia atriventris; Osmia avosetta; †Osmia basaltica; Osmia bicolor; Osmia bicornis; Osmia caerulescens; Osmia calaminthae; Osmia californica; Osmia cornifrons; Osmia cornuta; Osmia inermis; †Osmia kabutoiwica; Osmia latreillei; Osmia lignaria; Osmia ribifloris; Osmia spinulosa; Osmia uncinata; Osmia xanthomelana

= Mason bee =

Mason bee Temporal range: Miocene–Recent

Genus of insects

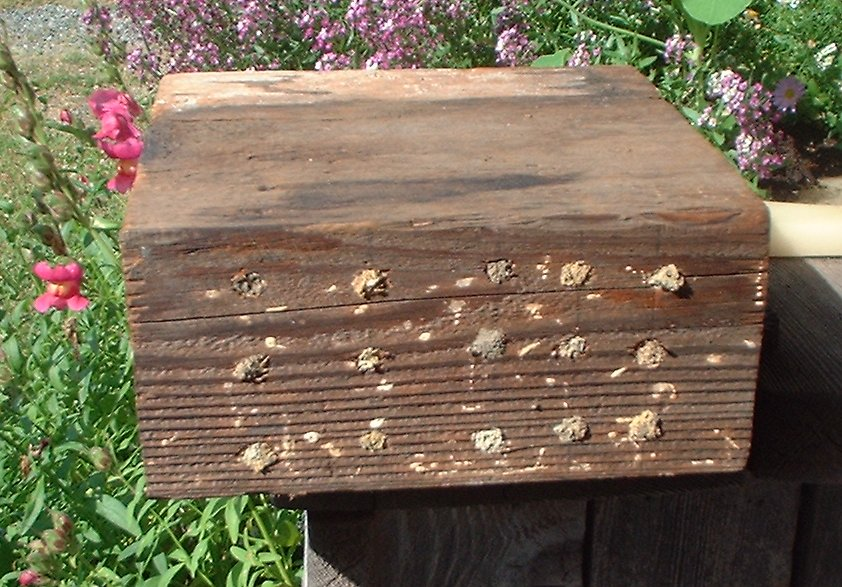
Homemade nest block showing full occupancy

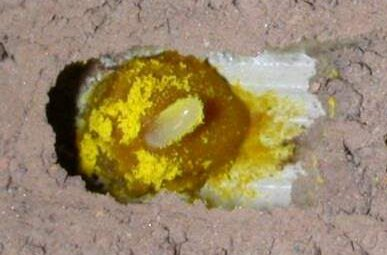
Mason bee nest cell with egg on pollen bed

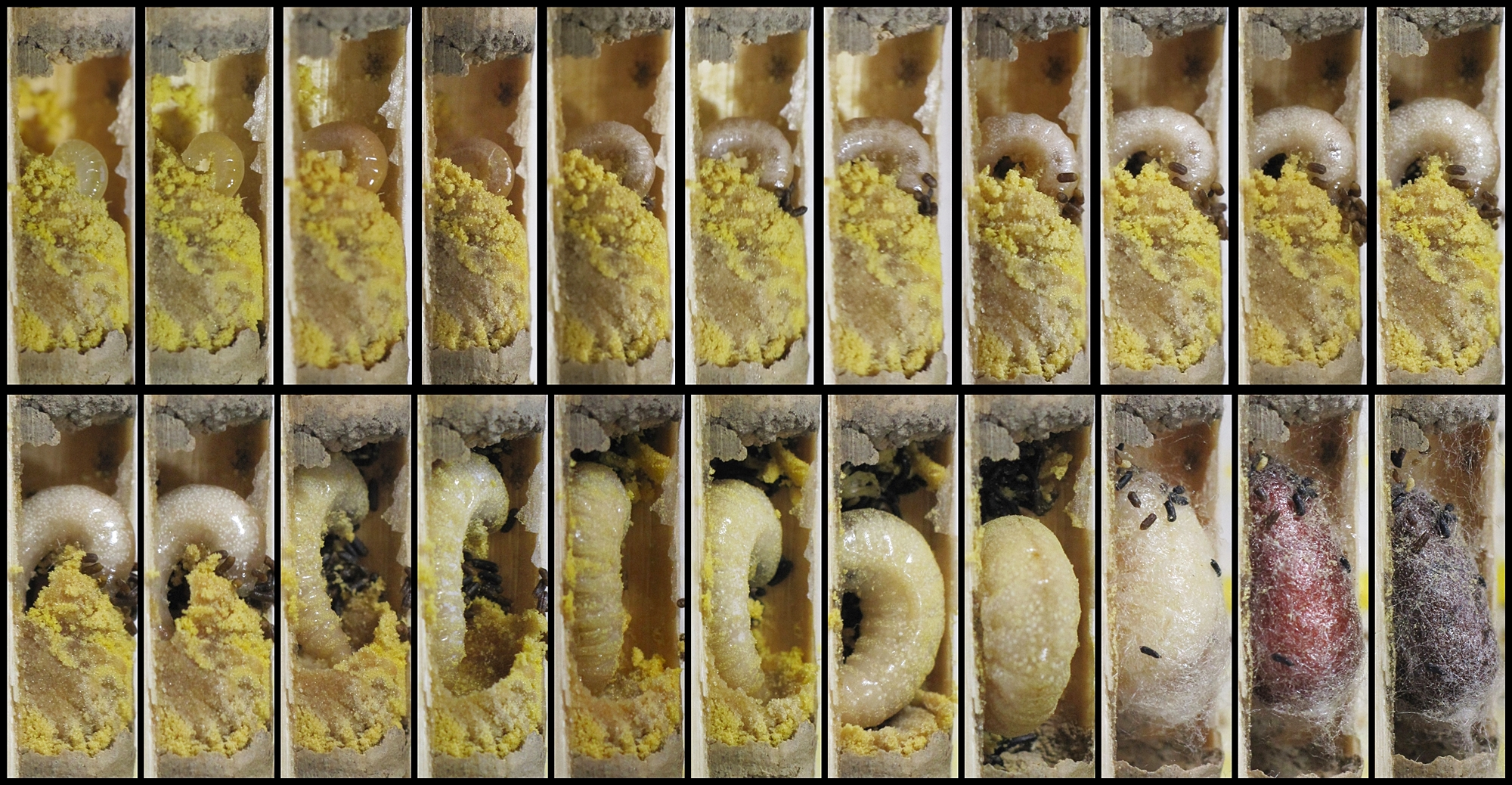
Worksheet cycle of larvae to cocoon

Mason bees are bees in the genus Osmia, of the family Megachilidae. Mason bees are named for their habit of using mud or other "masonry" products in constructing their nests, which are made in naturally occurring gaps such as cracks in stones or other small dark cavities. When available, some species preferentially use hollow stems or holes in wood made by wood-boring insects.

Species of the genus include the orchard mason bee O. lignaria, the blueberry bee O. ribifloris, the hornfaced bee O. cornifrons, and the red mason bee O. bicornis. The former two are native to the Americas, the third to eastern Asia, and the latter to the European continent, although O. lignaria and O. cornifrons have been moved from their native ranges for commercial purposes. Over 300 species are found across the Northern Hemisphere. Most occur in temperate habitats within the Palearctic and Nearctic realms, and are active from spring through late summer.

Osmia species are frequently metallic green or blue, although many are blackish and at least one rust-red. Most have black ventral scopae which are difficult to notice unless laden with pollen. They have arolia between their claws, unlike Megachile or Anthidium species.

Historically, the term mason bee has also been used to refer to bees from a number of other genera under Megachilidae such as Chalicodoma, most notably in "The Mason-Bees" by Jean-Henri Fabre and his translator Alexander Teixeira de Mattos in 1914.

== Life cycle ==
Unlike honey bees (Apis) or bumblebees (Bombus), Osmia species are solitary; every female is fertile and makes her own nest, and no worker bees for these species exist.

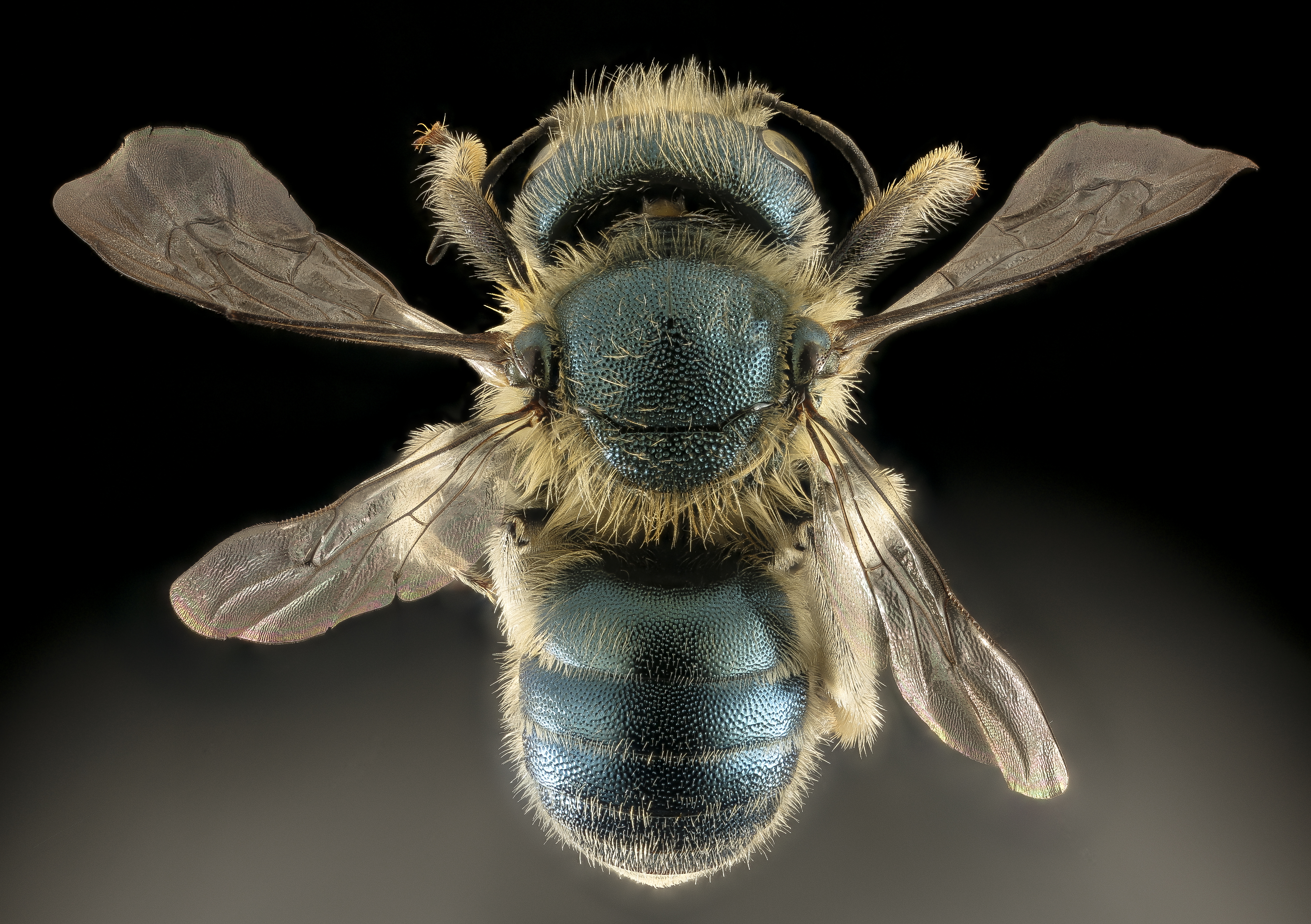
Eastern snail shell mason bee (Osmia conjuncta)

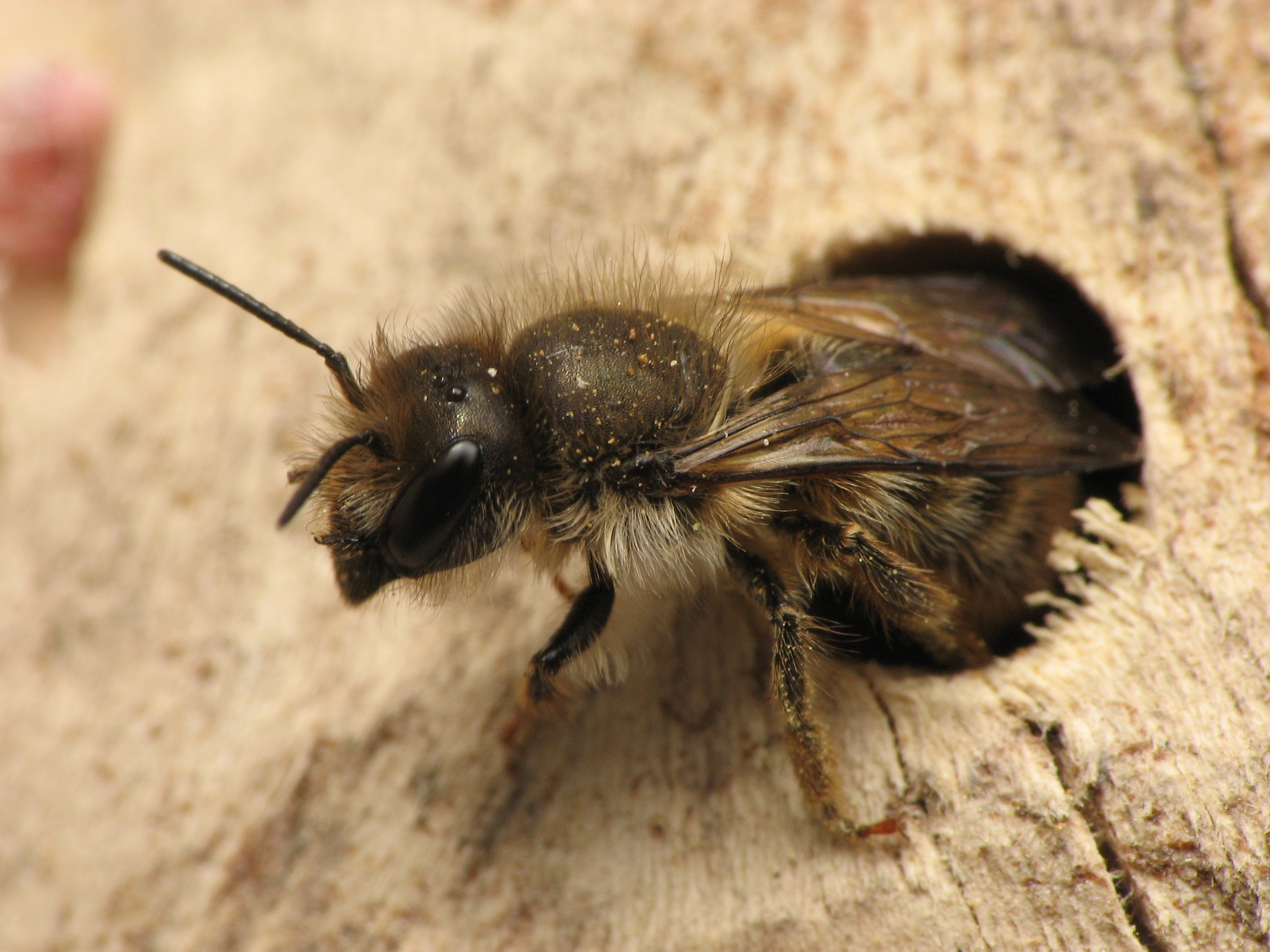
Hornfaced bee (Osmia cornifrons)

When the bees emerge from their cocoons, the males exit first. The males typically remain near the nests waiting for the females, and some are known to actively extract females from their cocoons. When the females emerge, they mate with one or several males. The males soon die, and within a few days the females begin provisioning their nests.

Osmia females typically nest in narrow gaps and naturally occurring tubular cavities. Commonly, this means in hollow twigs but can be in abandoned nests of wood-boring beetles or carpenter bees, in snail shells, under bark, or in other small protected cavities. They do not excavate their own nests. The material used for the cell can be clay, mud, grit, or chewed plant tissue. The palearctic species O. avosetta is one of a few species known for lining their nest burrows with flower petals. A female might inspect several potential nests before settling in.

Within a few days of mating, the female has selected a nest site and has begun to visit flowers to gather pollen and nectar for her nests; many trips are needed to complete a pollen/nectar provision mass. Once a provision mass is complete, the bee backs into the hole and lays an egg on top of the mass. Then, she creates a partition of "mud", which doubles as the back of the next cell. The process continues until she has filled the cavity. Female eggs are laid in the back of the nest and male eggs toward the front.

Once a bee has finished with a nest, she plugs the entrance to the tube, and then may seek out another nest location.

Within weeks of hatching, the larva has probably consumed all of its provisions and begins spinning a cocoon around itself and enters the pupal stage, and the adult matures either in the fall or winter, hibernating inside its insulatory cocoon. Most Osmia species are found in places where the temperature drops below 0 °C (32 °F) for long durations and they are well-adapted to cold winters; chilling seems to be a requirement for maturation. Some species of mason bees are semi-voltine, meaning that they have a two-year maturation cycle, with a full year (plus) spent as a larva.

== Anatomy and morphology ==
Osmia share a basic anatomy with all bees and most insects; the main functional regions being the head, thorax, and abdomen. On the head, Osmia have three small ocelli, two large compound eyes, antennae, and a mouth. On the thorax, Osmia have six legs and four wings. The abdomen of females contains a scopa for pollen-collecting, absent in males. Although the scopa is usually located on the legs in most bees, it lies underneath the abdomen for Osmia and other genera in the family Megachilidae.

== Pollination ==
Osmia can pollinate very efficiently, which is largely attributed to their anatomy and behavior. Unlike most other bee species that collect pollen from their hind legs, female Osmia and other bees in the family Megachilidae use pollen-collecting hairs from their abdominal scopa. When Osmia transfer pollen to flowers, dry pollen falls from the scopa onto the flower's stigma, facilitating pollination at nearly every visit. Osmia typically pollinate early spring flowers in the family Rosaceae, and will even forage under poor weather conditions.

Some farmers currently manage populations of Osmia to facilitate efficient pollination on their farms. However, using non-native Osmia species as managed pollinators has ignited the spread of disease, introducing invasive bee species that increase competition for native bees. In some areas, native Osmia species are in decline as of 2020; practices to minimize the impact of non-native pollinators on wild species include prioritizing the use of native bee species, raising local bee populations, and enforcing parasite/disease screening.

== Management ==
A Mason Bee working on the terminal wall of a piece of bamboo in which it has laid its eggs

Solitary bees produce neither honey nor beeswax. They are immune from acarine and Varroa mites, but have their own unique parasites, pests, and diseases. The nesting habits of many Osmia species lend themselves to easy cultivation, and a number of Osmia species are commercially propagated in different parts of the world to improve pollination in fruit and nut production. Commercial pollinators include O. lignaria, O. bicornis, O. cornuta, O. cornifrons, O. ribifloris, and O. californica. They are used both as an alternative to and as an augmentation for European honey bees. Mason bees used for orchard and other agricultural applications are all readily attracted to nesting holes – reeds, paper tubes, nesting trays, or drilled blocks of wood; in their dormant season, they can be transported as intact nests (tubes, blocks, etc.) or as loose cocoons. As is characteristic of solitary bees, Osmia species are very docile and rarely sting when handled (only under distress such as when wet or squeezed); their sting is small and not painful, and their stinger is unbarbed.

== See also ==
- List of Osmia species
