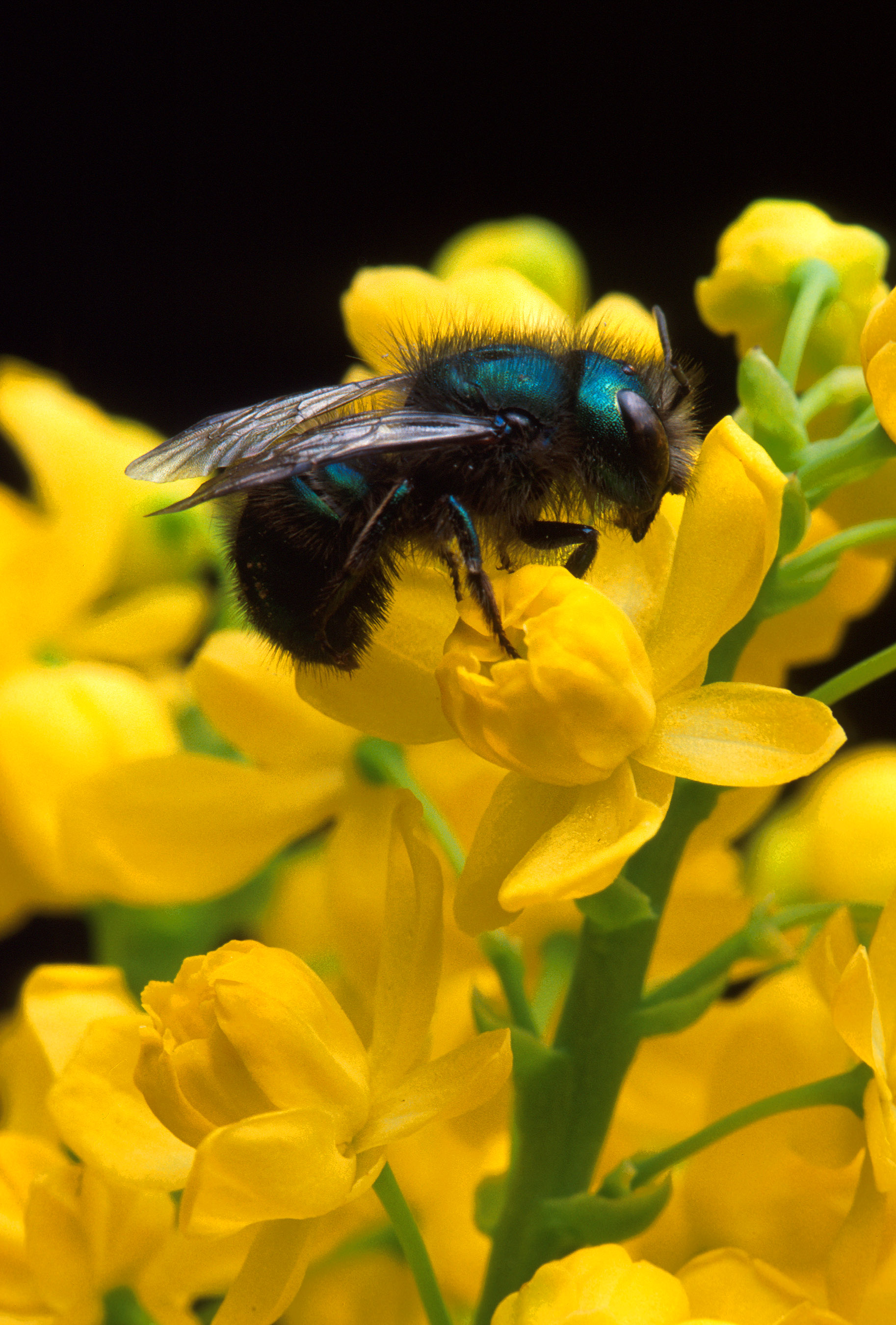

Scientific classification
- Domain: Eukaryota
- Kingdom: Animalia
- Phylum: Arthropoda
- Class: Insecta
- Order: Hymenoptera
- Family: Megachilidae
- Genus: Osmia
- Species: O. ribifloris

Binomial name
- Osmia ribifloris Cockerell, 1900

= Osmia ribifloris =

Species of bee

Osmia ribifloris, one of several species referred to as a blueberry bee, is a megachilid bee native to western North America, including Oregon, California, Nevada, Utah, Arizona, New Mexico, Texas and northern Mexico. This solitary bee normally gathers pollen from plants in the family Ericaceae, with manzanita, Arctostaphylos sp. and Oregon Grape being preferred hosts in the wild. It will pollinate blueberries, and is sometimes used commercially for this purpose.
