= Pollenizer =

Plant that provides pollen

A pollenizer (or polleniser), sometimes pollinizer (or polliniser, see spelling differences), is a plant that provides pollen.

The word pollinator is often used when pollenizer is more precise. A pollinator is the biotic agent that moves the pollen, such as bees, moths, bats, and birds. Bees are thus often referred to as 'pollinating insects'.

The verb form to pollenize is to be the source of pollen, or to be the sire of the next plant generation.

While some plants are capable of self-pollenization, pollenizer is more often used in pollination management for a plant that provides abundant, compatible, and viable pollen at the same flowering time as the pollinated plant. For example, most crabapple varieties are good pollenizers for any apple tree that blooms at the same time, and are often used in apple orchards for the purpose. Some apple cultivars produce very little pollen or pollen that is sterile or incompatible with other apple varieties. These are poor pollenizers.

A pollenizer can also be the male plant in dioecious species (where entire plants are of a single sex), such as with kiwifruit or holly.

Nursery catalogs often specify that a cultivar should be planted as a "pollinator" for another cultivar, when they actually should be referring to it as a pollenizer. Strictly, a plant can only be a pollinator when it is self-fertile and it physically pollinates itself without the aid of an external pollinator.
