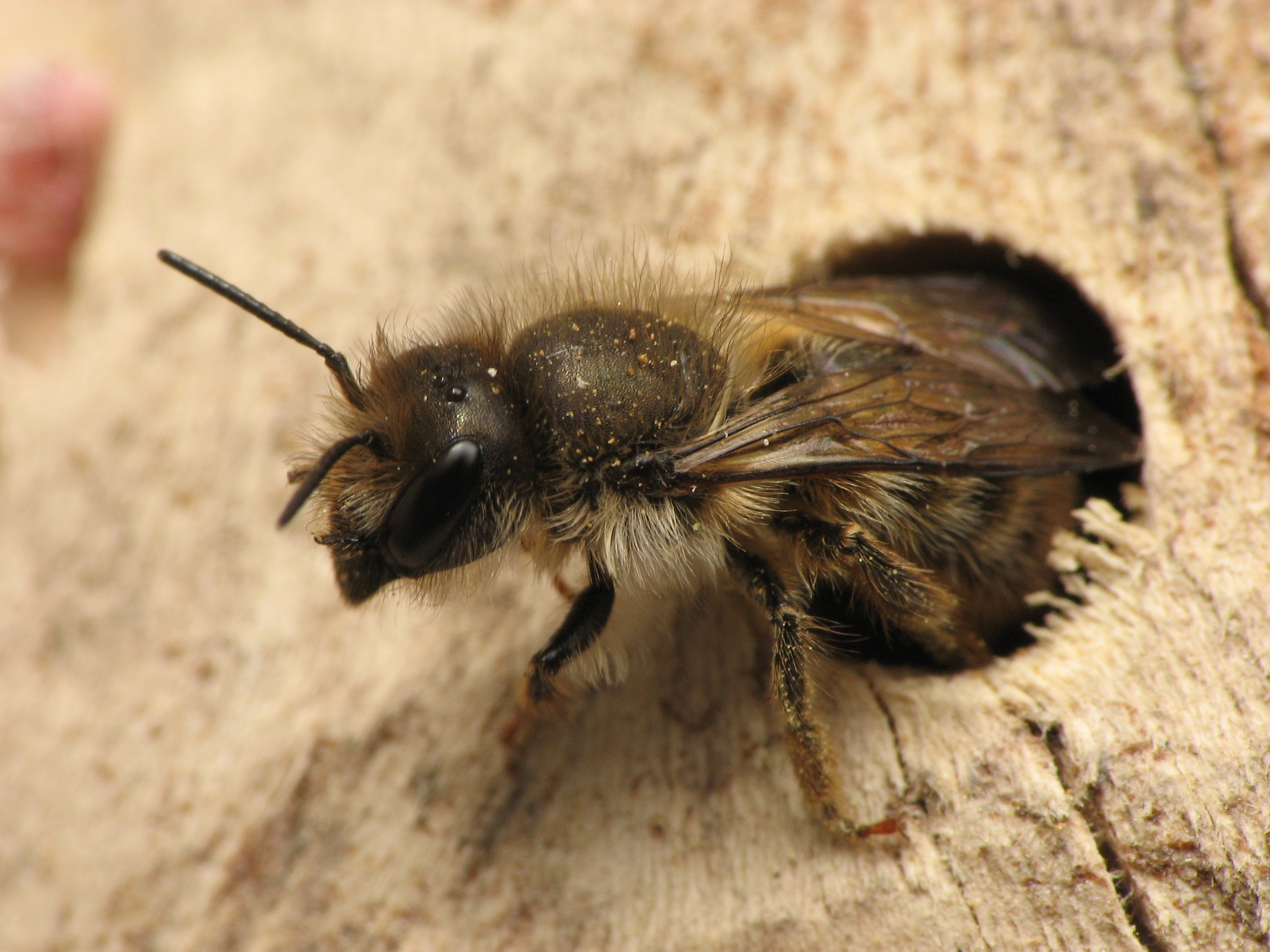

Conservation status
- Secure (NatureServe)

Scientific classification
- Kingdom: Animalia
- Phylum: Arthropoda
- Class: Insecta
- Order: Hymenoptera
- Family: Megachilidae
- Genus: Osmia
- Species: O. cornifrons

Binomial name
- Osmia cornifrons (Radoszkowski, 1887)

= Osmia cornifrons =

Horned-face bee

Species of bee

Osmia cornifrons, also known as the horned-face bee, is a species of solitary bee indigenous to Northern Asia. Physically, this species of bee is recognized for its horn-like extensions originating from its lower face. Populations of O. cornifrons have been recorded in multiple locations, including Japan, Korea, China, and Russia. O. cornifrons are more docile as compared to other species of bees and are less prone to sting when aggravated.

== History ==
Osmia cornifrons was first introduced in Japan in the 1940s and were managed for crop pollination. Over a 50-year time period, use of O. cornifrons gradually increased until more than half of the apple orchards in Japan utilized this species. In 1977, O. cornifrons was introduced in the northeastern United States in an attempt to increase pollination productivity of fruit crops. This species was reintroduced multiple times during the following years.

== Crop pollination ==
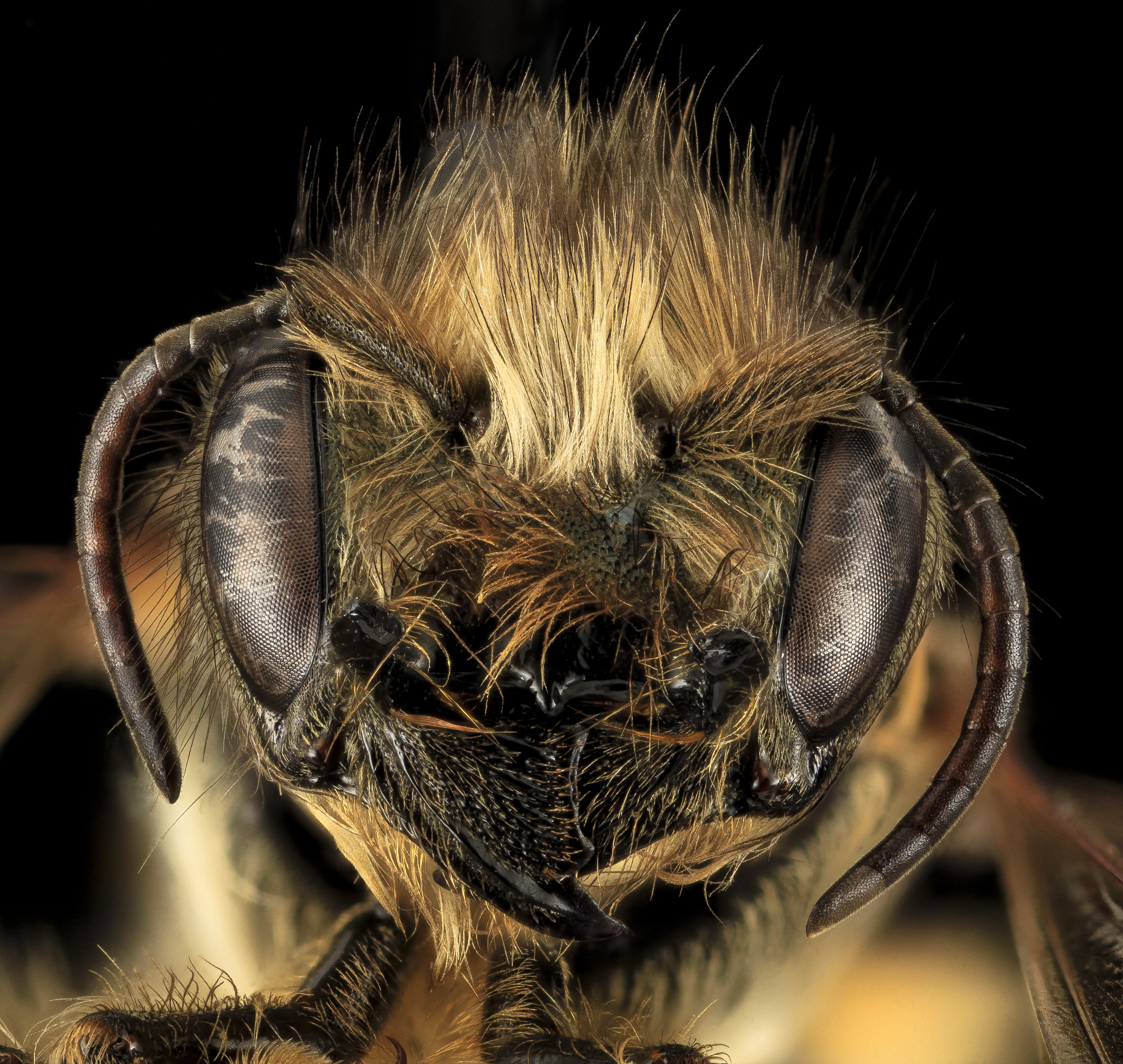
Face of O. cornifrons

This species of bee has been utilized for its effectiveness in pollinating flowers at a rapid rate. A single bee can visit up to 2,500 flowers a day and will spend 4–8 minutes per flower. Osmia cornifrons has a high flower constancy, signifying that the bee will return to the same species of flower. Both males and females will create a nest within 130 meters of a crop field; however, nest locations have been noted to exceed this distance; some being situated 700 meters away. It is a diurnal species that is most active between 6AM–8PM, depending on the location of the sun. They will avoid foraging during raining spells, as they are not well suited to fly in that type of weather. O. cornifrons is more adept to humid environments and performs optimally in regions that have consistent humidity, however, are capable of functioning in cooler environments. This ability to perform in a wide range of environmental temperatures makes them highly valued bees for crop pollination as well as making them more effective pollinators than honeybees.

== Development and biology ==
Osmia cornifrons have relatively short adult life spans and spend most of their time undergoing development. Life cycles can be broken up into six different stages, including: spring incubation, pre-nesting, nesting, development, prewintering, and wintering. Male and female emergence times are dependent on weather conditions during spring incubation and wintering periods. The wintering period is when bees are enclosed in cocoons to decrease exposure to cold temperatures. Time of emergence is temperature dependent and the rate at which heat is acquired can advance or delay emergence times. Extended wintering periods increase the risk of mortality due to prolonged consumption of stored body fat. Males emerge from their nests around April, just prior to the blooming of apple orchards. Females arise from their nests 2–3 days later. Emergence periods are consistently close with the blooming of crops. Early emergence increases the risk of inadequate resource accumulation and flower pollination. A male will wait outside of a female’s nest and attempt to court the female by mounting her back and rubbing his antennae against her abdomen. This courtship may last several hours before the female allows the male to mate with her. After mating has completed, both males and females will leave and travel to a nearby field patch where they both serve as pollinators, which is consistent with pre-nesting behavior. Male bees will serve as pollinators for multiple weeks and will eventually die off. Females leave their nests for several days until ovarian development has concluded and will either return to the nest that they emerged from or create a new nest in which to lay their eggs. Poor environmental/weather stability may alter pre-nesting activity, thereby adversely affecting the timing of ovarian development. A female will collect pollen from a nearby crop, bring it into the nest, and then disperse the pollen as a pollen ball. Eggs are placed on top of the pollen ball and are typically 1/10 the length of the female body'. Females can lay up to 30 eggs over the course of their lifespan. It is hypothesized that females are capable of controlling the sex of its progeny through haplodiploid sex determination. Male progeny are haploid and female progeny are diploid. Female bees are provided more pollen as larvae, which is associated with female bees having a larger stature as compared to males. Nests under distress will predominantly have male progeny. Female progeny are more costly and require consistent resources for proper development. Although there is an increased energy cost for females, females are more effective in collecting resources and pollinating crops as compared to males. Larvae development is temperature dependent. Adequate development occurs between 12 °C and 18 °C, but has been noted to occur at 25 °C as well. Development will either decrease significantly or halt outside of this temperature range. O. cornifrons risk death when exposed to temperatures below 10 °F.

== Nesting ==
Osmia cornifrons use bamboo, reeds, and previously existing holes in trees as nesting sites. To determine the size of a location, the bee will enter and move toward the end of the potential new nest. The bees will perform specific physical movements, including turning upside down and moving left and right to inspect the site thoroughly. If females utilize a previously used nest, they will remove all of the remaining debris that has been left. In the nest, females will create individual cells in which they lay a single egg. After an egg has been placed, the female bee closes off the cell with mud.

== Parasitism ==
Populations of Osmia cornifrons are antagonized by different pest species (mites) including, but not limited to, Chaetodactylus nipponicus, Chaetodactylus hirashimai, and Chaetodactylus krombeini. C. krombeini have been noted to heavily infest O. cornifrons populations and have the highest negative impact on overall productivity and lifespan to horn-faced bees. C. krombeini that inhabit a nest will consume the pollen that was provided by a female O. cornifrons for her larvae. The decrease in pollen provisions is great enough that larvae have an increased risk of mortality or inadequate development. Poor development of larvae, especially of female larvae, has been directly correlated with decreased pollination ability and productivity in populations of O. cornifrons infested by mites.
