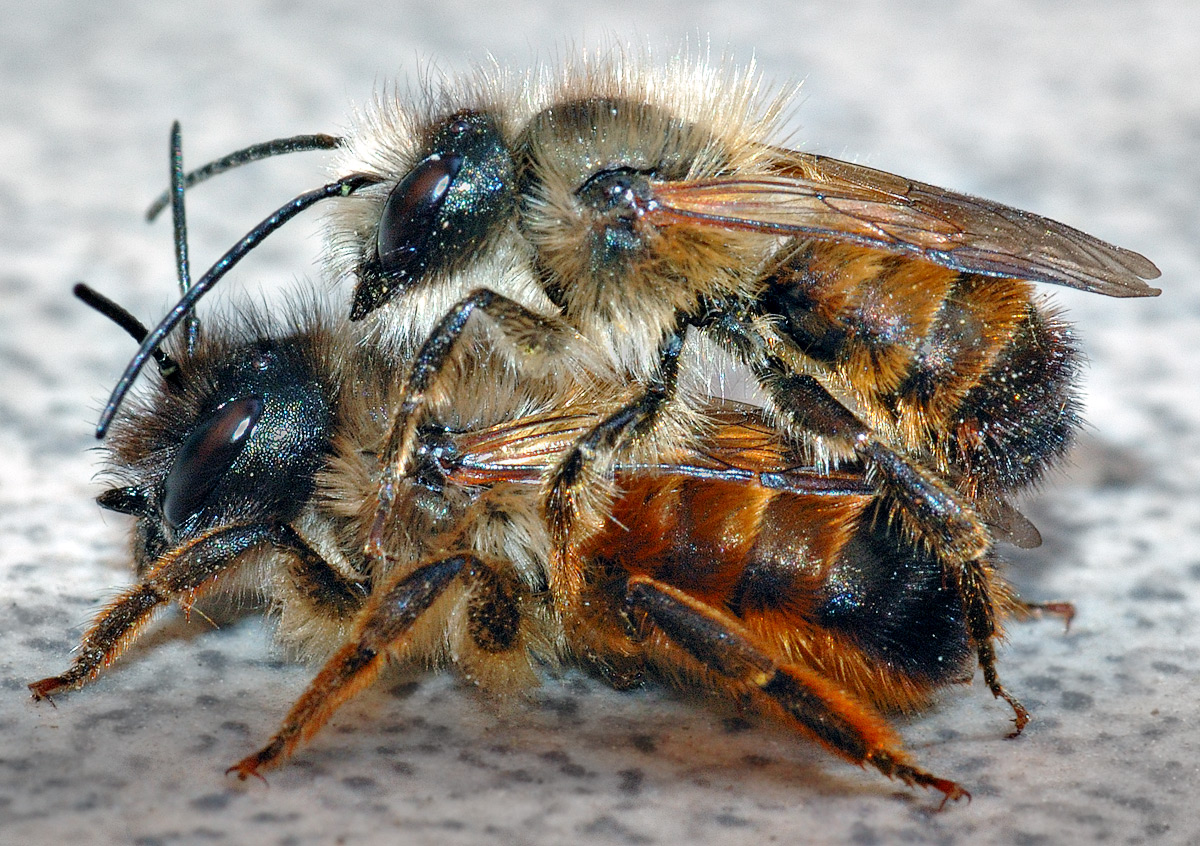

Conservation status
- Least Concern (IUCN 3.1)

Scientific classification
- Kingdom: Animalia
- Phylum: Arthropoda
- Clade: Pancrustacea
- Class: Insecta
- Order: Hymenoptera
- Family: Megachilidae
- Genus: Osmia
- Species: O. bicornis

Binomial name
- Osmia bicornis (Linnaeus, 1758)

Synonyms
- Osmia rufa (Linnaeus, 1758); Apis bicornis Linnaeus, 1758; Apis rufa Linnaeus, 1758; Apis agino Harris, 1776; Apis cornigera Rossi, 1790; Apis fronticornis Panzer, 1799; Osmia hedera Smith, 1844; Osmia fracticornis Pérez, 1895; Osmia rufa var. borealis Ducke, 1899

= Osmia bicornis =

Red mason bee

Species of bee

Osmia bicornis (synonym Osmia rufa) is a species of mason bee, and is known as the red mason bee due to its covering of dense gingery hair. It is a solitary bee that nests in holes or stems and is polylectic, meaning it forages pollen from various different flowering plants. These bees can be seen aggregating together and nests in preexisting hollows, choosing not to excavate their own. These bees are not aggressive; they will only sting if handled very roughly and are safe to be closely observed by children. Females only mate once, usually with closely related males. Further, females can determine the sex ratio of their offspring based on their body size, where larger females will invest more in diploid females eggs than small bees. These bees also have trichromatic colour vision and are important pollinators in agriculture.

== Taxonomy and phylogeny ==
This species is part of the order Hymenoptera, which consists of bees, wasps, ants, and sawflies, and a member of the family Megachilidae, which mostly consists of solitary bees, and is among 11 species of Osmia identified in Britain. O. bicornis is the current scientific name for this bee, although it was formerly known as O. rufa. In 1758, Linnaeus described the male of this species under the name Apis rufa and described the female as a separate species Apis bicornis. In 1802 Kirby recognised that A. bicornis and A. rufa were the same species and he named this species Apis bicornis. Subsequently, the opinion was put forth that A. rufa was the correct name, because it appeared before bicornis in the Systema Naturae. The use of the name rufa does not comply with the International Code of Zoological Nomenclature's rules, however; the concept of "line priority" does not exist in the rules, and the action of the first revising author, Kirby, must be followed. Thus the correct scientific name for the species is Osmia bicornis, although O. rufa is still widely used. Three subspecies of O. bicornis are often recognized, namely O. b. bicornis, O. b. cornigera, and O. b. fracticornis.

== Description and identification ==
O. bicornis is about the same body size as the honeybee. Sexual dimorphism is observed in this species; females are larger than males, because the female larvae are provisioned with (and eat) more pollen. Body size in O. bicornis decreases as temperature in brood cells increases. Beyond 25 °C, body growth can be severely truncated, leading to small adult body size or mortality. The male and females are also distinguishable by antenna length, with males possessing an additional antenna segment, (characteristic of almost all Hymenoptera).

=== Males ===
Males are 8–10 mm long. They have a grey-white tuft of hair on their faces, including on the clypeus.

=== Females ===
The females have two horns and darker hairs on their heads, and are 10–12 mm long. Clypeal hairs are absent in females.

== Distribution and habitat ==
O. bicornis is found in England, southern Scotland (possibly northern Scotland, as well), Wales, Ireland, mainland Europe, Sweden, Norway, North Africa, Georgia, Turkey, and Iran. Of the 11 species identified of Osmia in England, O. bicornis is both the largest and most common species present.

O. bicornis occupies a variety of nesting sites within nature and in sites of human construction. These bees have been known to nest in key holes, empty snail shells, plant stems, and empty beetle hollows. O. bicornis occupies the old shells of these three species: Helix nemoralis, Helix hortensis, and Helix pomatia and the nests of Anthophora species. Additionally, these bees make their nests in such sites as sandy banks, decaying trees planted in clay soil like the willow tree, old-mortared walls, flint stone holes, garden shed fifes, and window frame holes and cracks.

The maximum foraging distance for O. bicornis is about 600 m, though generally high plant density around the nests allows bees to forage closer to the nest and for a shorter duration.

== Nest structure ==
The nest of O. bicornis consists of an array of partitioned cylindrical cells in holes in wood or reed tubes. These bees accept a diverse range of pre-existing cavities as nest sites. The cells are arranged linearly within a narrow tube. If the internal diameter of the tube exceeds 12 mm, then this linear arrangement may be forced into two rows instead of one. The length of each cell can vary from 10 to 21 mm. The inner sides of the partitions are rough and convex, while the outer sides are smooth and concave. Between the cells and the terminal plug is a space known as the vestibular cell. The vestibule acts as a form of protection against volatile environmental conditions. The bees whose nests are exposed to the sun and heat build vestibules more frequently. The material used to build the nests is mud mixed with their mandibles, but the sides of the tunnel in which the nests are located are usually not lined with mud, with the exception of some irregularly arranged nests. Females construct around six cells per nest on average; however, larger females construct more cells than smaller ones. When it is time for females to lay their eggs, they add pollen to each brood cell and lay one egg in each cell next to the pollen. The sequence of nesting behavior is: cell construction, provisioning, egg-laying, and sealing the cell.

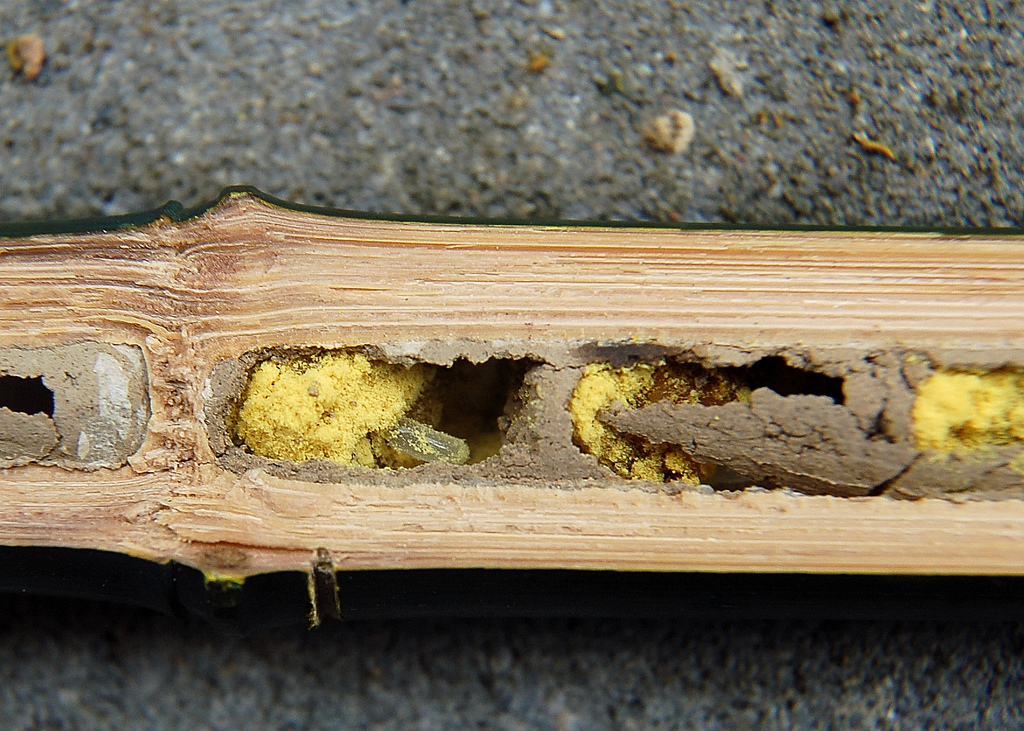
A cross-sectional view of an O. bicornis nest: Partitioned cells can be seen in a tube.

Cells containing females are typically larger than those containing males, due to the sexual dimorphism of the species. Additionally, cells containing females are situated towards the back of the nest, while those with males are closer to the nest entrance. Because of this, male offspring leave the nest sooner than females. Due to the linear arrangement of cells in the nest, the youngest bee leaves earlier than older ones.

== Developmental cycle ==
Although these bees may be seen into late June, they are most active during the spring and early summer. Each year, one generation of bees is formed, making an appearance during the spring. About one week after eggs are laid in the brood cells, the eggs hatch and larvae develop through the summer. The larvae then enter the pupal stage upon spinning cocoons, in which the anterior collar, nipple area, and outer meshwork of the cocoon are spun simultaneously. The adults then hibernate through the winter in the cocoons and finally emerge as mature bees in the spring. The eggs hatch after about one week; the larvae start spinning a cocoon about one month after hatching. The bees become adults in the fall, but stay quiescent until next spring.

During cocoon formation, the larva uses saliva to encompass the faecal material and cell. The anterior part of the cocoon is composed of a domed collar and a central, domed nipple region, and the larva weaves salivary "silk" threads in a circular pattern in this region. The larva also uses its digestive contents to form smears on the cocoon, leading to the hardening of the cocoon and a colour change to a dark, red-brown. In this stage, in which the organism becomes classified as an imago, the metabolic rate of the imago declines because it must have enough food to survive the winter. Both the imago's body weight and fat body weight decrease.

Male larvae are placed in front of the females within the nest, allowing the males to emerge first in the spring. Specifically, female eggs are laid in inner brood cells, while male eggs are laid in the outer brood cells. Upon emergence, females fly around for about eight weeks. These bees store mostly pollen moistened with a small amount of nectar, which is eaten by the larvae during the summer before they rest through the winter in a cocoon.

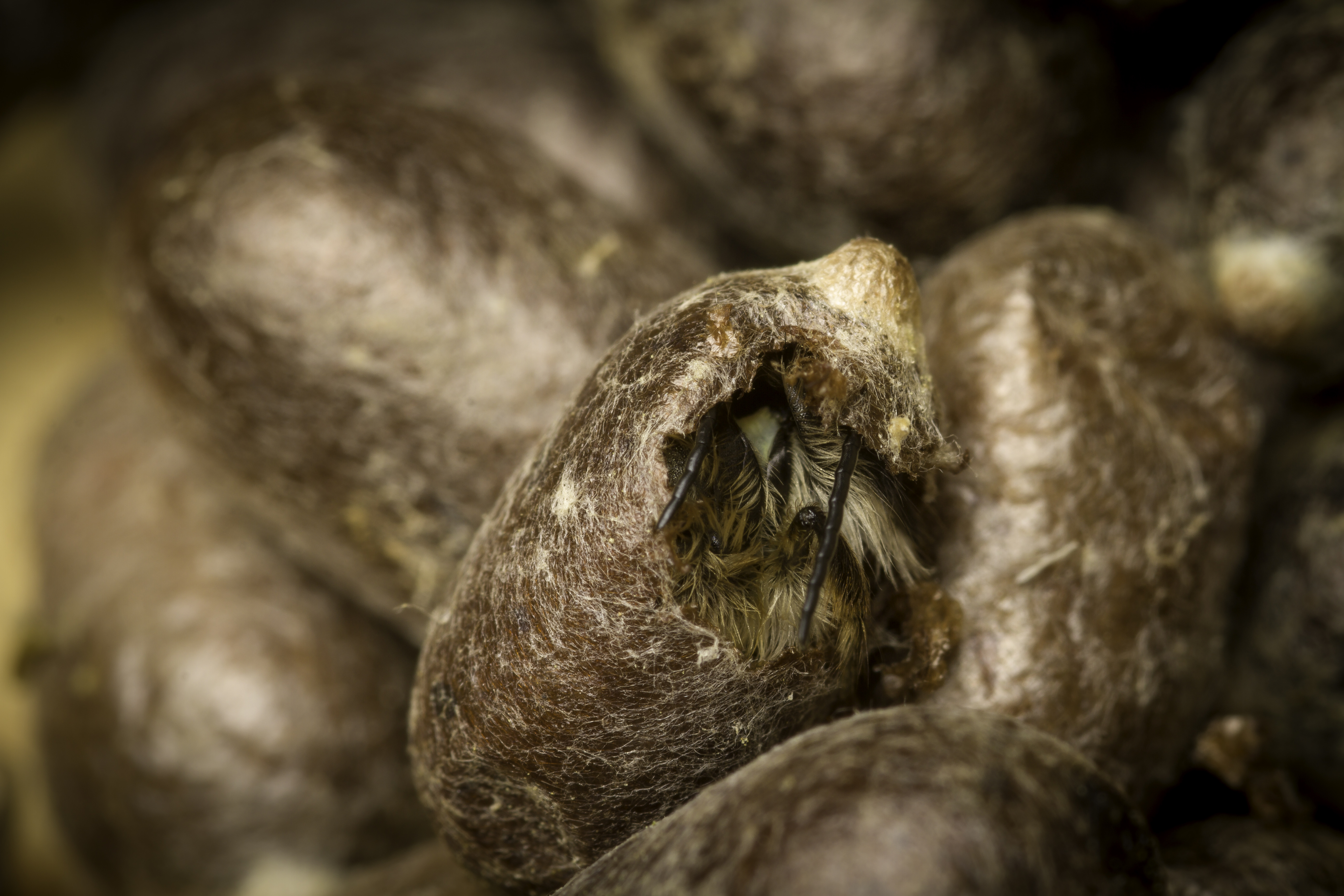
Red mason bee hatching from cocoon

== Behaviour ==
=== Colour vision ===
O. bicornis bees possess a trichromatic colour system, which they use in foraging for pollen from flowers; the three colours are ultraviolet, blue, and green. A similar colour system is found in these bee species: Apis mellifera, Bombus terrestris, B. lapidarius, B. monticola, B. jonellus, Vespula germanica, and V. vulgaris. Studies comparing the colour systems of O. bicornis and A. mellifera show both species share the same spectral sensitivity functions in ultraviolet and blue receptors, while the green receptor in O. bicornis is sensitive to longer wavelengths than in A. mellifera.

=== Mating behaviour ===
During mating season, male behaviour with respect to pursuing females is varied, with some males establishing territories close to nesting sites where females emerge and other males observing flowering sites nearby. Males do not normally engage in intrasexual aggression, though they do inspect each other. When a specific mate of interest is present, however, signs of aggression are evident among males. When several males become aware of a receptive female, all males try to mount her; the males do not assault each other directly. In some cases, females may escape and not mate with any of the males.

Females are monogamous, mating with one male within a few days after emergence in the spring. However, males encounter difficulties in completing successful copulation with females, including male inability to determine from where and when females will emerge. Nests are dispersed widely, increasing the number of sites from which new females can emerge. Additionally, females fly away from the nests as soon as they emerge, increasing the mating challenge for males. To counteract these difficulties, males can increase their mating chances by positioning themselves close to foraging sites. Factors including value, patrolling time, and the number of competing males are taken into account when males roam foraging sites for females.

In male-female interactions, males sense potential mates by observing the body shape of females, and by evaluating the female's sense, determine whether a specific female will be receptive to copulation. Females use such cues as the vibrational bursts of the male thorax, which has been suggested to be a sign of male health and overall fitness, color, and odor to select mates. Successful mating of females does not depend on male body size, but on the speed with which males discover female mates. Further, females do not always choose the male with the largest body size, a choice that possibly indicates a preference exists for an optimum male body size; often, females choose males with intermediate body sizes. Yet, the sperm supply of each male limits males to only performing seven copulations in their lifetimes.

==== Mating technique ====
O. bicornis females attract males through sex pheromones, which are localized on their cuticle surfaces. Extracts of the cuticle elicit copulatory behavior in males of O. bicornis.

During courtship, the male O. bicornis stands on the back of the female to try to persuade her to mate. Several indicators of persuasion by the male include vibrating his thorax, rubbing himself against the female, rubbing his antennae over hers, and rubbing his legs over her compound eyes. The female, however, can choose to reject the male and may push him off her back. The three phases to mating in O. bicornis are precopulatory courtship, copulation, and postcopulatory embrace. In the spring, when a female first emerges, males in close proximity approach her. When a male establishes his position on the female's dorsum, other males retreat. During what is called the precopulatory phase, the male rubs the female's mesothorax with his first two pairs of legs. The male then strokes her antennae with his own to persuade her to copulate. Simultaneously, he rubs her eyes with his front legs. Every stroking motion is recognizable to humans as a high-pitched humming sound, which soon turns into buzzing as the male attempts to copulate. In an attempt to copulate, the male moves backward (on the female) and tries to insert his genitalia into the female's genital chamber, during which he drums on the female's face to produce a tremolo. If the female chooses the male, copulation begins. If she rejects the male, she can bend her abdomen downward to try to shake him off. The male either stops or repeats his attempts at copulation. If the male successfully attains the female, copulation occurs for several minutes. This is followed by a postcopulatory phase which lasts up to 13 minutes. At this time, the male applies an antiaphrodisiac on the female by stroking his abdomen over her in the posterior to anterior direction.

Females of O. bicornis have a mating plug in their genital chambers after mating. While the mating plug is thought to prevent females from mating with other males, its function is not clear in O. bicornis as of yet.

=== Sex allocation ===
Female body size is indicative of the sex allocation of offspring. Larger females are able to collect more pollen than smaller females, making larger females less prone to open-cell parasitism while away from the nest. To "make the best of a bad job", or counteract the disadvantage they have, smaller females deliberately produce more male offspring and reduce female offspring body size. These changes occur because the smaller females are obtaining less pollen; investing in offspring that require fewer food provisions – males – therefore allows smaller females to combat their handicap. Larger females, in contrast, had more female offspring. In addition to increased foraging efficiency, females hold other advantages over small females, including increased egg production and longevity. Because it does not benefit males to be larger in size, due to the independence of body size on female mating selection, females normally invest more in female offspring.

Female age also predicts sex allocation in offspring. Older females are less efficient at foraging for pollen in nest construction than younger females. Thus, they produce more male offspring and reduce the size of offspring.

== Diapause ==
Diapause allows O. bicornis to survive harsh winter conditions. Typically in adult insects, reproductive diapause is characterized by a late development of gonads and a buildup of energy reserves. However, diapause in O. bicornis is somewhat different. The ovaries of females are not completely inactive during overwintering, as the development of oocytes continues in the vitellarium region. O. bicornis begins diapause in November, and diapause termination occurs toward the end of January. Diapause typically lasts around 100 days.

The two phases of overwintering in O. bicornis are diapause and postdipause quiescence. During diapause, the values of the supercooling point decreases, but diapause itself is independent of temperature variation. Temperatures of 20 °C lead to the bees' death. During postdiapause quiescence, the bees develop normally, but their development is inhibited by temperature variation.

== Foraging and diet ==
Females spend between 80 and 95% of their time invested in preparing cells in foraging. O. bicornis has shown a strong inclination towards collecting pollen from maple and oak trees, like most other solitary bees. These bees require nectar along with pollen, and while maple provides both, oak provides only pollen. Those females that collect pollen from oak trees must also collect nectar from other plant sources. While the species is polylectic, females temporarily and locally forage on one or two plant species with great pollen abundance to maximize pollen mass collected per unit of time. This is done to reduce provisioning time to exploit as much pollen as possible in a short period of time during unstable environmental conditions in the spring and to reduce the risk of open-cell parasitism. Pollen diversity has shown no effect on the developmental success of O. bicornis offspring, hence it is more beneficial for females to maximize pollen mass from a few species than to regard pollen diversity. Protein consumption is one of the major factors influencing the growth of bees. Since maple and oak pollen have similar protein content (with a deviation up to 5%), larvae reared on the diet of either plant do not differ in cocoon weight – hence the offspring of O. bicornis develop equally on the pollen of both zoophilous and anemophilous plants. When oak and maple are no longer in bloom, the bees tend to forage on pollen from poppy and buttercup plants.

Environmental temperature and cocoon weight are negatively related for O. bicornis. Larvae decrease their food intake as the temperature rises and start cocoon-spinning earlier, resulting in smaller body mass.

== Interaction with other species ==
=== Kin selection ===
Kin recognition is associated with mate selection in O. bicornis. Females select males for mating with which they are more closely related. This behavior suggests that females may select males from within their population as opposed to more distance populations. One rationale for this behavior is that males within the same populations as females are better adapted to local environmental conditions than more distant males.

=== Diet ===
O. bicornis feeds on pollen, the amount of which affects larval growth. A majority of the pollen these bees consume comes from Ranunculus acris, R. bulbosus, R. repens, and Quercus robur flowering species. Pollen consumption has also been suggested to impact the fitness of individuals in the colony. These bees also consume nectar. When the nectar supply is limited, however, they may consume honeydew.

=== Parasites ===
Predators and parasites of O. bicornis include birds, mice, Monodontomerus obscurus Westwood, Chaetodactylus osmiae, Cacoxenus indagator, and Anthrax anthrax. C. osmiae hypopi parasitizes nests through phoresy and affects both adults and broods. Both C. indagator and A. anthrax lay their eggs while the O.bicornis female adds food to the nest cells. For instance, C. indagator, a member of the family Drosophilidae, may be found in nest cells eating pollen. The organism's activity sometimes results in the bee larvae dying from a lack of sufficient food.

==== Open-cell parasitism and maternal investment ====
The fitness of the female O. bicornis can be compromised by brood cell parasitism. Since the nest entrances of O. bicornis are not sealed, the contents of the nests (such as larvae, pollen, or nectar) are targeted by parasites while the female is out on a provisioning trip. The risk of being parasitized is related to the time the cell is left unguarded by the bee. Hence, the parental investment of the female bee can be limited by time constraints. Certain factors that can affect provisioning time include senescence and the size of offspring. The older a bee gets, the longer its provisioning time takes, due to the wearing out of the exoskeleton, wings, and pollen-collecting apparatus, as well as the aging of muscles used for flight. These impairments force older bees to make more provisioning trips. Additionally, since sexual dimorphism in the bees gives rise to larger female offspring than male, mothers can choose to fertilize the egg to produce a daughter earlier in the season (i.e. when they are able to forage most efficiently (and a son later)). O. bicornis females have been shown to reduce the body mass of their offspring as their provisioning efficiency declined, to reduce the time spent away from the nest, and hence reduce the risk of parasitism on their offspring. This reduction can be achieved by shifting their investment from daughters to sons over the course of the nesting season.

== Importance ==
=== Agriculture ===
Red mason bees are excellent pollinators, particularly of apple trees. For effective use of these bees as pollinators of winter rape plantations in Poland, they should be located at least 300 m from entomophilous plants, which distract the bees from pollinating the plants of interest.

=== Stings ===
Normally, O. bicornis does not sting unless it is threatened and must defend itself. The female does have a sting, but it is much less severe than honeybees or wasps. The venom within the stinging apparatus has been shown to be like that of the honeybee. However, the venom apparatus from O. bicornis contains fewer barbs than that of honeybees, possibly explaining why O. bicornis venom does not penetrate human skin like that of the honeybee. Protein components in the venom, such as osmin, have been linked to antimicrobial, antifungal, and haemolytic activities.
