= Pollination management =

Horticultural practices to enhance pollination

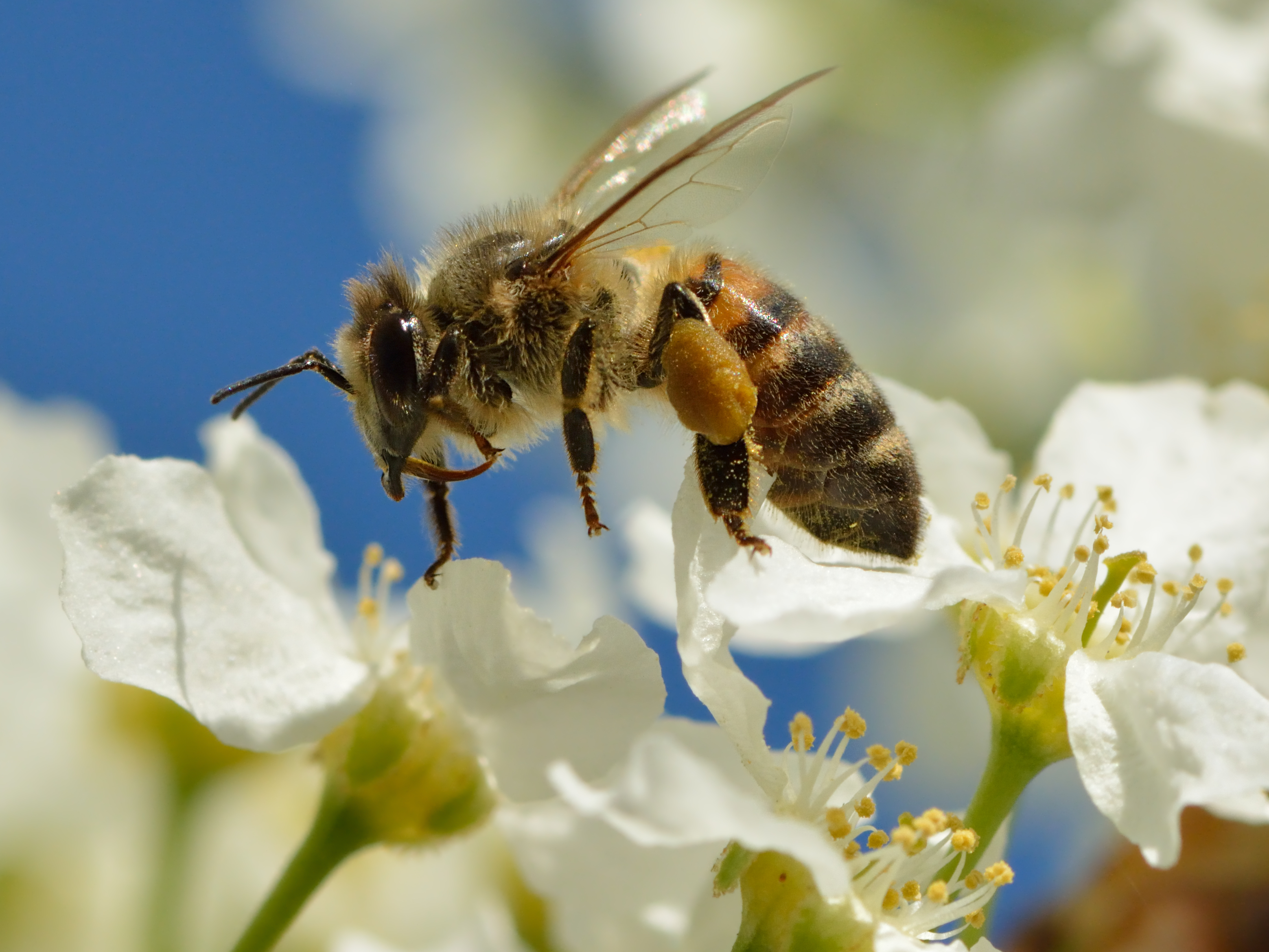
Honey bee on bird cherry Honey bees are especially well adapted to collecting and moving pollen, thus are the most commonly used crop pollinators. Note the light brown pollen in the pollen basket.

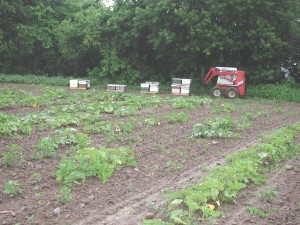
Placing honey bees for pumpkin pollination Mohawk Valley, NY

Date pollinator up an 'Abid Rahim' palm tree

Pollination management is the horticultural practice that accomplishes or enhances pollination of a crop, to improve yield or quality, by understanding of the particular crop's pollination needs, and by knowledgeable management of pollenizers, pollinators, and pollination conditions.

While people think first of the European honey bee when pollination comes up, in fact many different means of pollination management are used, both other insects and other mechanisms. Other insects are commercially available that are more efficient, like the blue orchard bee for fruit and nut trees; local bumblebees better specialized for some other crops; hand pollination that is essential for production of hybrid seeds and some greenhouse situations; and even pollination machines.

== Pollinator decline ==
With the decline of both wild and domestic pollinator populations, pollination management is becoming an increasingly important part of horticulture. Factors that cause the loss of pollinators include pesticide misuse, unprofitability of beekeeping for honey, rapid transfer of pests and diseases to new areas of the globe, urban/suburban development, changing crop patterns, clearcut logging (particularly when mixed forests are replaced by monoculture pine), clearing of hedgerows and other wild areas, bad diet because of loss of floral biodiversity, and a loss of nectar corridors for migratory pollinators. With the declining habitat and resources available to sustain bee populations, populations are declining.

== Pollination limitation ==
Pollination management has become increasingly important because there may be too few pollinators available to pollinate crops, hence they become limiting. This has been called pollination limitation (PL) and may lead to a reduction in yield due to insufficient or inefficient pollination. However, PL has declined by 50% between 1950 and the 2010s, apparently mainly because of pollination management, that is, because many fields are now supplemented with managed pollinators.

== Importance ==
The increasing size of fields and orchards (monoculture) increases the importance of pollination management. Monoculture can cause a brief period when pollinators have more food resources than they can use (but monofloral diet can reduce their immune system) while other periods of the year can bring starvation or pesticide contamination of food sources. Most nectar source and pollen source throughout the growing season to build up their numbers.

Crops that traditionally have had managed pollination include apple, almonds, pears, some plum and cherry varieties, blueberries, cranberries, cucumbers, cantaloupe, watermelon, alfalfa seeds, onion seeds, and many others. Some crops that have traditionally depended entirely on chance pollination by wild pollinators need pollination management nowadays to make a profitable crop. Many of these were at one time universally turning to honeybees, but as science has shown that honeybees are actually inefficient pollinators, demand for other managed pollinators has risen. While honeybees may visit dozens of different kinds of flowers, diluting the orchard pollen they carry, the Blue orchard bee will visit only the intended tree, producing a much higher fertilization rate. The focus on the specific tree also makes the orchard bee 100 times more efficient at pollinating, per bee.

Some crops, especially when planted in a monoculture situation, require a very high level of pollinators to produce economically viable crops, especially if depending on the more generalized honeybee. This may be because of lack of attractiveness of the blossoms, or from trying to pollinate with an alternative when the native pollinator is extinct or rare. These include crops such as alfalfa, cranberries, and kiwifruit. This technique is known as saturation pollination. In many such cases, various native bees are vastly more efficient at pollination (e.g., with blueberries), but the inefficiency of the honey bees is compensated for by using large numbers of hives, the total number of foragers thereby far exceeding the local abundance of native pollinators. In a very few cases, it has been possible to develop commercially viable pollination techniques that use the more efficient pollinators, rather than continued reliance on honey bees, as in the management of the alfalfa leafcutter bee.

In the case of the kiwifruit, its flowers do not even produce nectar, so that honeybees are reluctant to even visit them, unless present in such overwhelming numbers that they do so incidentally. This has led bumblebee pollination companies to begin offering their services for kiwifruit, as they appear to be far more efficient at the job than honeybees, even more efficient than hand pollination.

Number of hives needed per unit area of crop pollination
Common name	number of hives per acre	number of hives per hectare	number of bee visits per square meter/minute
Alfalfa	1, (3–5)	2.5, (4.9–12)	
Almonds	2–3	4.9–7.4	
Apples (normal size)	1	2.5	
Apples (semi dwarf)	2	4.9	
Apples (dwarf)	3	7.4	
Apricots	1	2.5	
Blueberries	3–4	7.4–9.9	2.5
Borage	0.6–1.0	1.5–2.5	
Buckwheat	0.5–1	1.2–2.5	
Canola	1	2.5	
Canola (hybrid)	2.0–2.5	4.9–6.2	
Cantaloupes	2–4, (average 2.4)	4.9–9.9, (average 5.9)	
Clovers	1–2	2.5–4.9	
Cranberries	3	7.4	
Cucumbers	1–2, (average 2.1)	2.5–4.9, (average 5.2)	
Ginseng	1	2.5	
Muskmelon	1–3	2.5–7.4	
Nectarines	1	2.5	
Peaches	1	2.5	
Pears	1	2.5	
Plums	1	2.5	
Pumpkins	1	2.5	
Raspberries	0.7–1.3	1.7–3.2	
Squash	1–3	2.5–7.4	
Strawberries	1–3.5	2.5–8.6	
Sunflower	1	2.5	
Trefoil	0.6–1.5	1.5–3.7	
Watermelon	1–3, (average 1.3)	2.5–4.9, (average 3.2)	
Zucchini	1	2.5	

It is estimated that about one hive per acre will sufficiently pollinate watermelons. In the 1950s when the woods were full of wild bee trees, and beehives were normally kept on most South Carolina farms, a farmer who grew ten acres (4.0 hectares) of watermelons would be a large grower and probably had all the pollination needed. But today's grower may grow 200 acres (81 hectares), and, if lucky, there might be one bee tree left within range. The only option in the current economy is to bring beehives to the field during blossom time.

== Types of pollinators ==
Organisms that are currently being used as pollinators in managed pollination are honey bees, bumblebees, alfalfa leafcutter bees, and orchard mason bees. Other species are expected to be added to this list as this field develops. Humans also can be pollinators, as the gardener who hand pollinates her squash blossoms, or the Middle Eastern farmer, who climbs his date palms to pollinate them.

The Cooperative extension service recommends one honey bee hive per acre (2.5 hives per hectare) for standard watermelon varieties to meet this crop's pollination needs. In the past, when fields were small, pollination was accomplished by a mix of bees kept on farms, bumblebees, carpenter bees, feral honey bees in hollow trees, and other insects. Today, with melons planted in large tracts, the grower may no longer have hives on the farm; he may have poisoned many of the pollinators by spraying blooming cotton; he may have logged off the woods, removing hollow trees that provided homes for bees, and pushed out the hedgerows that were home for solitary native bees and other pollinating insects.

== Planning for improved pollination ==
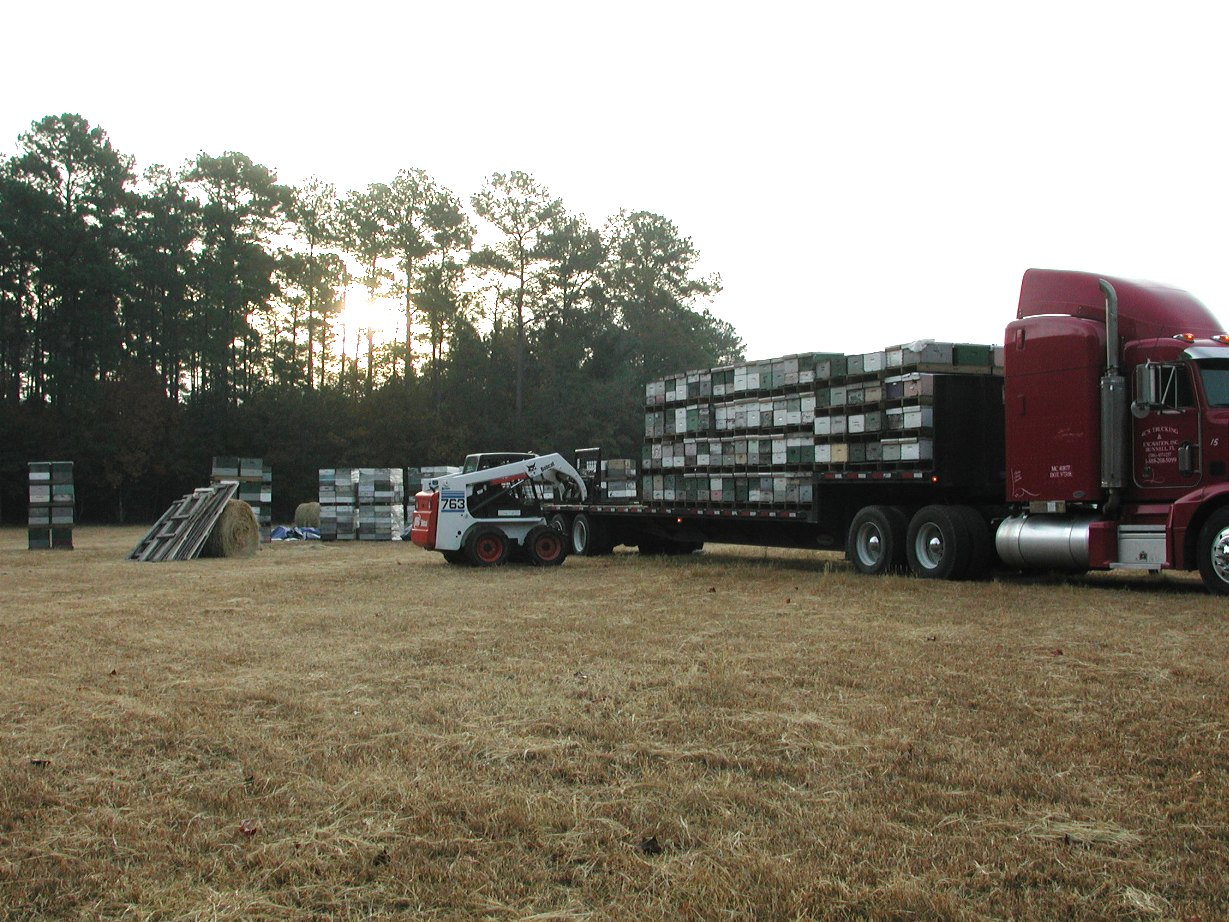
US migratory commercial beekeeper moving spring bees from South Carolina to Maine for blueberry pollination

Before pollination needs were understood, orchardists often planted entire blocks of apples of a single variety. Because apples are self-sterile, and different members of a single variety are genetic clones (equivalent to a single plant), this is not a good idea. Growers now supply pollenizers, by planting crab apples interspersed in the rows, or by grafting crab apple limbs on some trees. Pollenizers can also be supplied by putting drum bouquets of crab apples or a compatible apple variety in the orchard blocks.

The field of pollination management cannot be placed wholly within any other field, because it bridges several fields. It draws from horticulture, apiculture, zoology (especially entomology), ecology, and botany.

== Improving pollination with suboptimal bee densities ==
Growers' demand for beehives far exceeds the available supply. The number of managed beehives in the US has steadily declined from close to 6 million after WWII, to less than 2.5 million today. In contrast, the area dedicated to growing bee-pollinated crops has grown over 300% in the same time period. To make matters worse, in the past five years we have seen a decline in winter managed beehives, which has reached an unprecedented rate near 30%. At present, there is an enormous demand for beehive rentals that cannot always be met. There is a clear need across the agricultural industry for a management tool to draw pollinators into cultivations and encourage them to preferentially visit and pollinate the flowering crop. By attracting pollinators like honeybees and increasing their foraging behavior, particularly in the center of large plots, we can increase grower returns, and optimize yield from their plantings.
