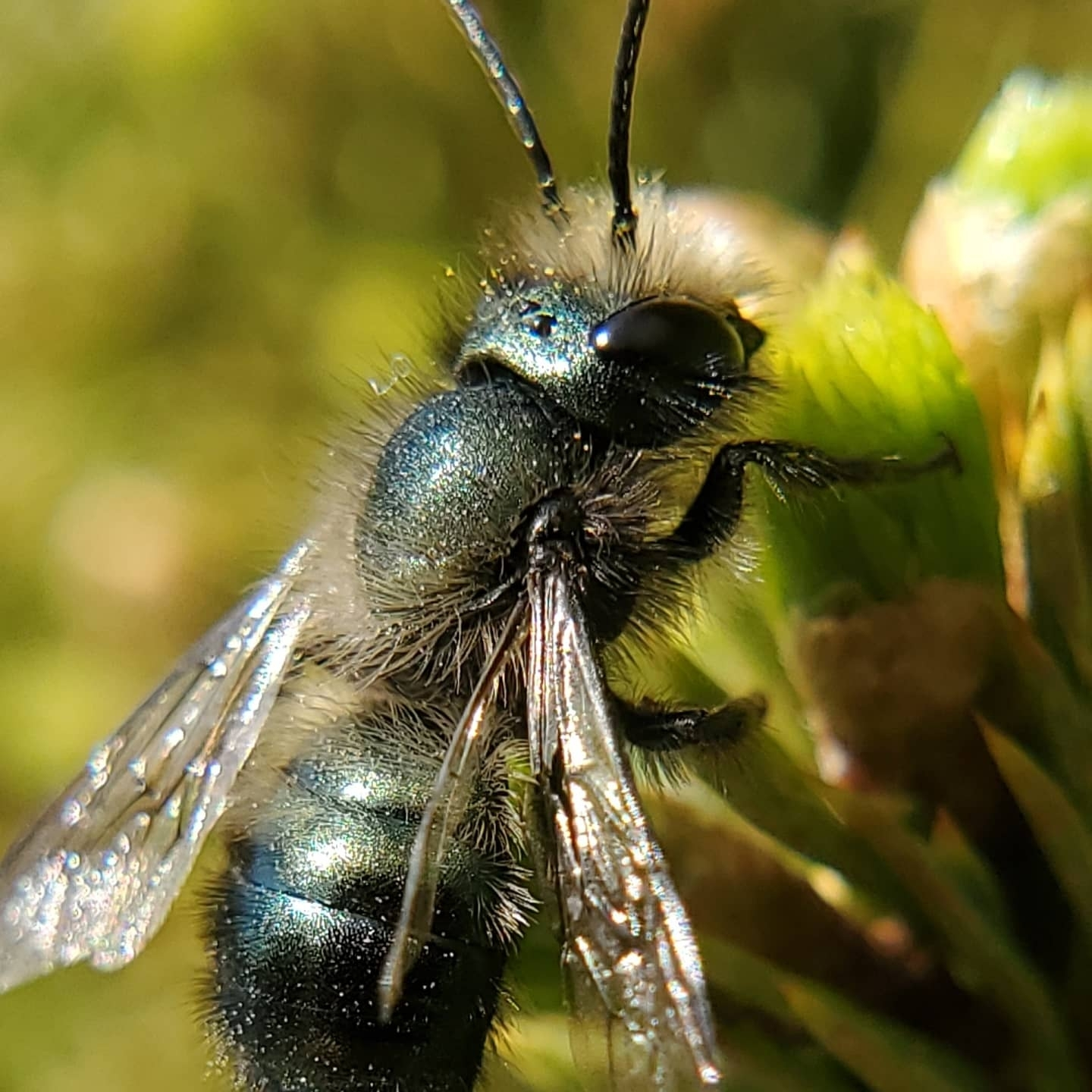
- Blue orchard bee, Multnomah County, Oregon, 2021

Scientific classification
- Kingdom: Animalia
- Phylum: Arthropoda
- Clade: Pancrustacea
- Class: Insecta
- Order: Hymenoptera
- Family: Megachilidae
- Genus: Osmia
- Species: O. lignaria

Binomial name
- Osmia lignaria Say, 1837

= Osmia lignaria =

Species of bee

Osmia lignaria, commonly known as the orchard mason bee or blue orchard bee, is a megachilid bee that makes nests in natural holes and reeds, creating individual cells for its brood that are separated by mud dividers. Unlike carpenter bees, it cannot drill holes in wood. O. lignaria is a common species used for early spring fruit bloom in the United States and Canada, though a number of other Osmia species are cultured for use in pollination.

== Native origin ==
O. lignaria is among 4000 native bee species of North America, and its species is divided by the Rocky Mountains into two subspecies, O. l. propinqua (western subspecies) and O. l. lignaria (eastern subspecies). The majority of research has been conducted in western orchards on the western subspecies. Efforts at establishing them outside their native range have met with mixed results. Researchers in one eastern study (Virginia / North Carolina) using the eastern O. l. lignaria found them to prefer the native redbud over the orchard fruits. They do not overwinter in Florida and the Gulf Coast because of the lack of cold winter temperatures needed in its development cycle. In the almond industry, where bloom time is early, the bee is raised under artificial conditions that trick it into emerging several weeks early, coincident with the almond bloom. While in much of the northwest conditions make it is easy to propagate O. l. propinqua, orchards are not always able to establish a self-sustaining population and often require importation of additional bees; on this research is continuing. In general, it is recommended that propagation and subsequent transport be confined to the bee's natural boundaries; commercial enterprise does not always respect these boundaries.

== Lifecycle ==
=== Spring ===
The bees begin to emerge from their cocoons in the spring when the daytime temperature reaches 14 °C (57 °F). The males emerge first. They remain near the nesting site and wait for the females to emerge, which can be several days to weeks depending on the number of days of warm weather. The first thing the females do is mate. A female typically mates once, or maybe twice. She is absent from the nesting site for several days while she feeds and waits for her ovaries to fully mature.

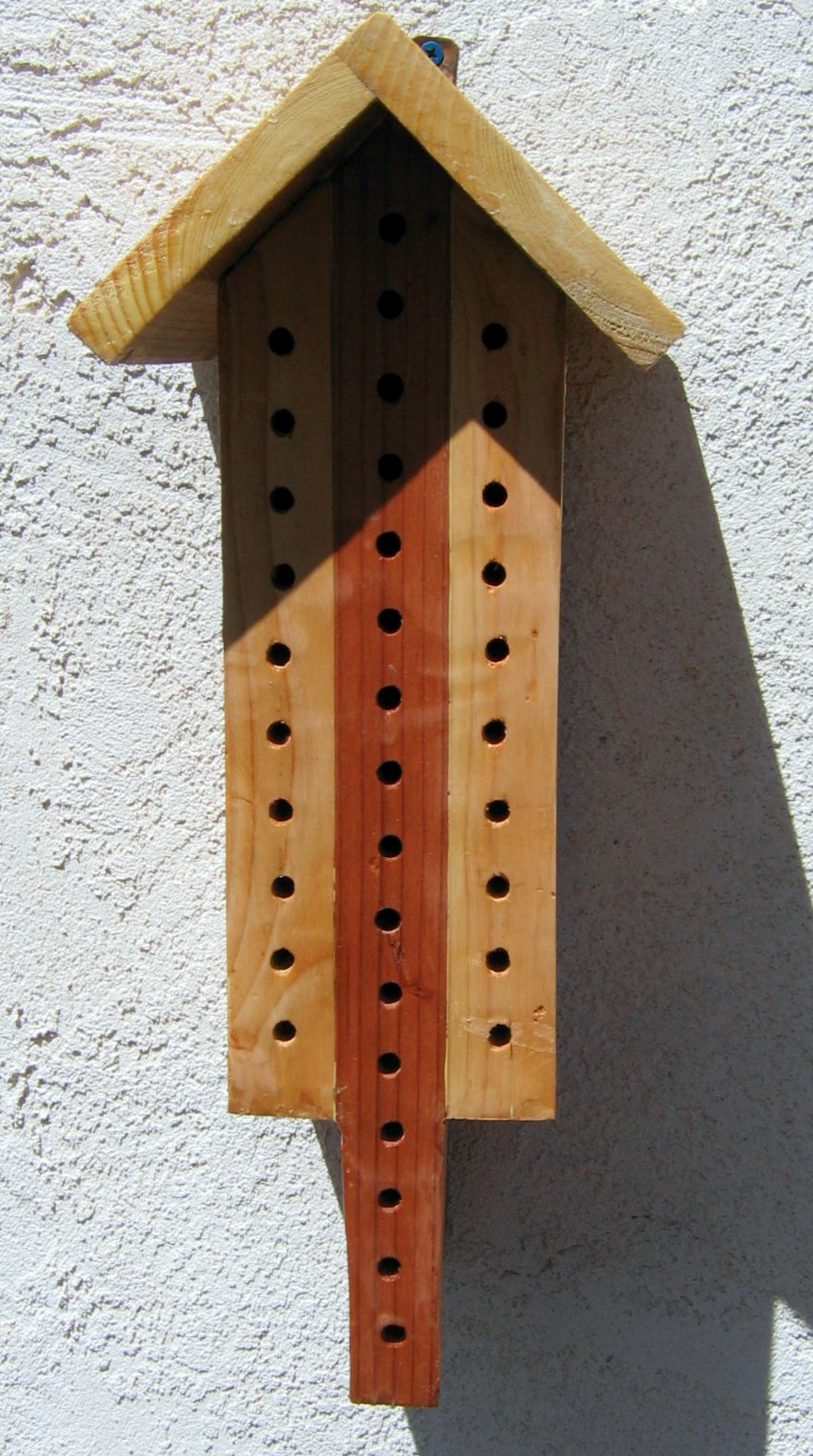
"Bee house" used for O. lignaria

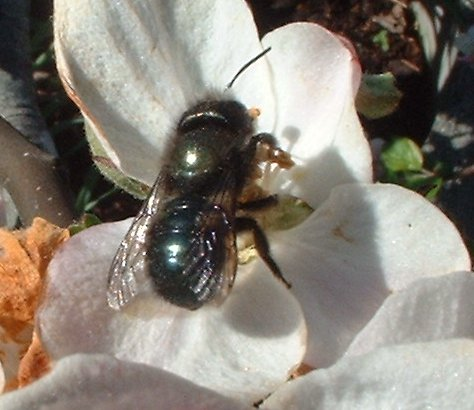
Orchard mason bee on an apple bloom

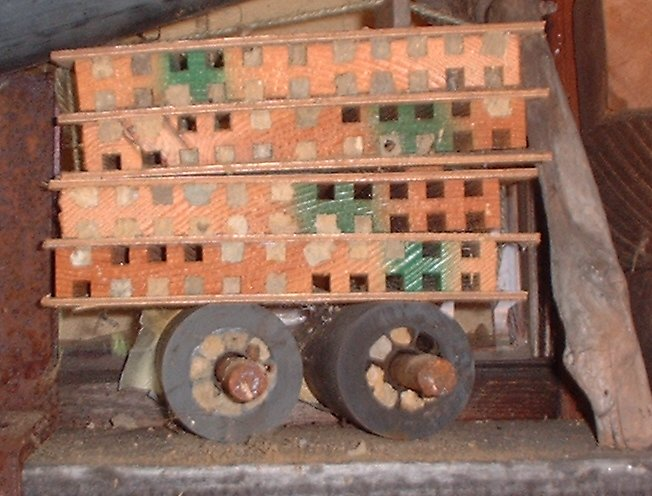
Example of nesting-site variations

When a female is ready, she seeks out a suitable nest. O. lignaria females nest in narrow holes or tubes, though they have been found to nest inside cedar shakes and even keyholes. Beekeepers place prepared nesting materials to entice the females to stay close to the orchard or nearby forage. Good nesting material (reeds, paper tubes, wood trays, or "bee condos") are as important as having the proper mud available (silty/clayey, as well as correct moisture content to grab/pack the mud). A female might inspect several potential nests before settling in. Once she has found a preferred nesting cavity, she flies outside of the hole and does an in-flight dance. She is orienting on major visual features to find her nest when she returns from foraging.

Orchard mason bees arrange their nests as a series of partitions, with one egg per partition. A female begins the process by collecting mud and building the back wall, if necessary, of the first partition. She then makes several back-and-forth trips to nearby flowers. Unlike honey bees, which visit flowers that are miles away, females visit flowers nearest the nest. One bee can visit 75 flowers per trip, and it takes 25 trips to create a complete pollen/nectar provision. The female works tirelessly during the day, only stopping once the sun has gone down. When the sun rises the next morning, she basks in its rays until warm enough to fly, then continues foraging.

Once the pollen provision is large enough, she backs into the hole and lays an egg directly upon it. She then collects more mud to seal off the partition. The new wall also doubles as the back wall of the next cell, and she continues until she has filled the nest hole with a series of offspring. O. lignara bees, like many insects, can select the gender of the egg they lay by fertilizing the egg, or not. Unfertilized eggs are males, while fertilized eggs are females. The adult bee lays female eggs in the back of the burrow, and the male eggs towards the front. On average, she lays about three males and one to two females per cavity. Because females are larger than males and require more pollen reserves, cavity dimensions can play a significant role in the cavity selection process.

When the egg hatches, the larva consumes the food provision and goes through many changes before becoming an adult. It will spend most of its life alone in this dark cell made by its mother.

Once the female has finished the nest, she plugs the entrance with a mud wall, thicker than the partitions that precede it. She then seeks another location for a new nest. She works tirelessly until she dies. An O. lignaria female lives for about four to eight weeks, and can fill an average of four six-inch tubes in her lifetime, with about eight eggs per tube. Her work includes nearly 60,000 blossom visits, and has attracted growers to propagate the insect for pollination purposes in fruit orchards.

=== Summer ===
By early summer, a larva has consumed all of its provisions and begins spinning a cocoon around itself and enters the pupal stage; the adult, flying mother dies off as the season progresses.

=== Fall and winter ===
The young bee is now a fully developed insect and undergoes diapause inside its cocoon for the duration of the winter. To stay warm, it burns through its fat reserves. If the weather stays cold for too long, the bee can die of starvation. Alternatively, if the temperature rises too fast, emergence may occur prematurely when pollen is scarce or the weather can return to cold temperatures for too long. Farmers are known to exploit the emergence cycle and time their release to coincide with the first orchard blossoms.

== Morphology ==
Osmia lignaria are relatively small bees, with dry weight of 33.5 ± 1.1 mg.

== Defense ==
Orchard mason bees, like all mason bees, are very shy and only sting if they perceive serious danger. They do not attack to defend themselves. The stinger is actually an egg guide. Because of their docile behavior, mason bees are preferred by people who desire pollination in urban settings.

== Parasites ==
Mason bees host a number of different parasites. The kleptoparasitic pollen mite Chaetodactylus krombeini is found especially in wetter parts of its range; it can starve the Osmia larvae by consuming the larval pollen mass. Sapygid wasps, genus Sapyga, are also kleptoparasites, with the larvae feeding on the pollen. Stelis montana is a cuckoo bee that sometimes invades nests. Both Stelis and Sapyga larvae spin a cocoon and develop in the Osmia nest.

Several parasitic wasps attack mason bees by piercing the larva in the nest and inserting eggs into the body; the wasp larvae consume the bee larva/pupa. This includes several chalcidoid wasps — tiny (2mm - 4mm) Monodontomerus species, Melittobia chalybii, and the largish yellow and black Leucospis affinis. Monodontomerus can be a serious pest of O. lignaria, but Leucospis is less common and Melittobia is more likely to parasitize other later emerging Osmia. Several species of cuckoo wasps, relatively large and metallic green, also consume Osmia larva, but these wasps develop next to the juvenile bee and consumes the larva from the outside.

The cavity nest of the mason bee can host Ptinus sexpunctatus, the six-spotted spider beetle, which feeds on other dead or decaying insects. It was discovered in North America in 2004, where it was accidentally introduced alongside Osmia species used for research as pollinators.

== See also ==
- Mason bees
