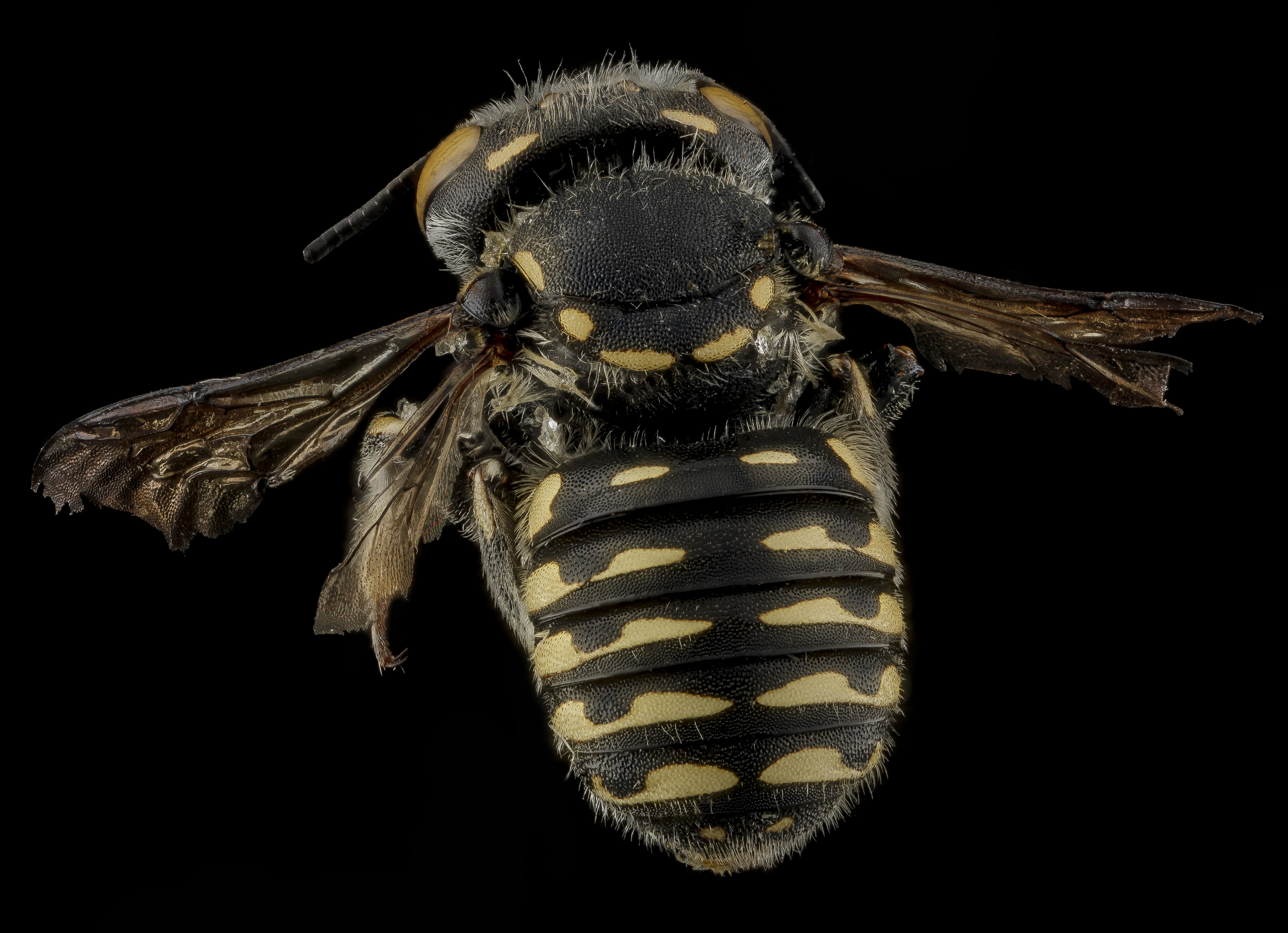

Scientific classification
- Kingdom: Animalia
- Phylum: Arthropoda
- Clade: Pancrustacea
- Class: Insecta
- Order: Hymenoptera
- Family: Megachilidae
- Genus: Anthidium
- Species: A. maculifrons

Binomial name
- Anthidium maculifrons Smith, 1854

Synonyms
- see text

= Anthidium maculifrons =

Species of bee

Anthidium maculifrons is a species of bee in the family Megachilidae, the leaf-cutter, carder, or mason bees.

== Distribution ==
Middle America and North America:

- United States
- Mexico

== Synonyms ==
Synonyms for this species include:

- Anthidium cognatum Cresson, 1878
- Anthidium zamoranicum Cockerell, 1949
