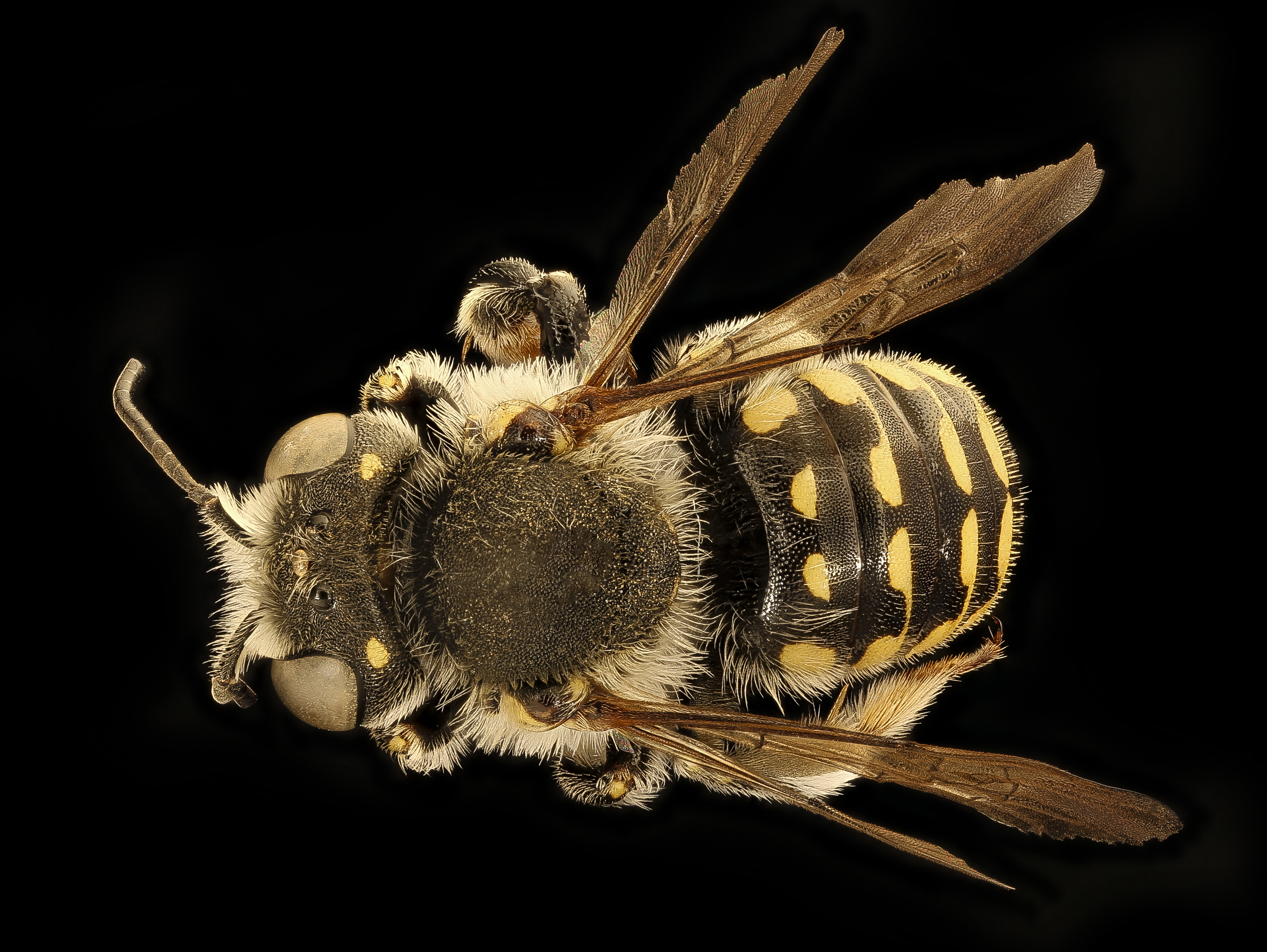

Scientific classification
- Kingdom: Animalia
- Phylum: Arthropoda
- Clade: Pancrustacea
- Class: Insecta
- Order: Hymenoptera
- Family: Megachilidae
- Genus: Anthidium
- Species: A. utahense

Binomial name
- Anthidium utahense Swenk, 1914

Synonyms
- See text

= Anthidium utahense =

Species of bee

Anthidium utahense is a species of bee in the family Megachilidae, the leaf-cutter, carder, or mason bees.

== Synonyms ==
Synonyms for this species include:

- Anthidium sagittipictum Swenk, 1914
- Anthidium divisum Cockerell, 1925
- Anthidium divisum nanulum Cockerell, 1925
- Anthidium divisum ornatifrons Cockerell, 1925
- Anthidium brachyurum Cockerell, 1925
