= Anthidium montivagum =

Scientific classification
- Kingdom: Animalia
- Phylum: Arthropoda
- Clade: Pancrustacea
- Class: Insecta
- Order: Hymenoptera
- Family: Megachilidae
- Genus: Anthidium
- Species: A. montivagum

Binomial name
- Anthidium montivagum Cresson, 1878

Species of bee

Anthidium montivagum is a species of bee in the family Megachilidae, the leaf-cutter, carder, or mason bees.

== Distribution ==
It was discovered in Colorado.
