= Anthidium mormonum =

Scientific classification
- Kingdom: Animalia
- Phylum: Arthropoda
- Clade: Pancrustacea
- Class: Insecta
- Order: Hymenoptera
- Family: Megachilidae
- Genus: Anthidium
- Species: A. mormonum

Binomial name
- Anthidium mormonum Cresson, 1878

Synonyms
- Anthidium blanditum Cresson, 1879; Anthidium pondreum Titus, 1902; Anthidium pecosense Cockerell, 1904; Anthidium bernardinum var. wilsoni Cockerell, 1904; Anthidium bernardinum var. fragariellum Cockerell, 1904; Anthidium blanditum praedentatum Cockerell, 1907; Anthidium wallisi Cockerell, 1913; Anthidium nebrascense Swenk, 1914; Anthidium praedentatum trianguliferum Swenk, 1914; Anthidium flavicaudum Cockerell, 1925; Anthidium wyomingense Schwarz, 1927; Anthidium mormonum hicksi Schwarz, 1934; Anthidium wallisi var. wallowana Schwarz, 1940

Species of bee

Anthidium mormonum is a species of bee in the family Megachilidae, the leaf-cutter, carder, or mason bees.
