= Anthidium banningense =

Conservation status
- Vulnerable (NatureServe)

Scientific classification
- Kingdom: Animalia
- Phylum: Arthropoda
- Clade: Pancrustacea
- Class: Insecta
- Order: Hymenoptera
- Family: Megachilidae
- Genus: Anthidium
- Species: A. banningense

Binomial name
- Anthidium banningense Cockerell, 1904

Synonyms
- see text

Species of bee

Anthidium banningense is a species of bee in the family Megachilidae, the leaf-cutter, carder, or mason bees.

== Distribution ==
North America

== Synonyms ==
Synonyms for this species include:

- Anthidium plumarium Cockerell, 1925
- Anthidium longispinum Schwarz, 1927
