= Anthidium undulatum =

Scientific classification
- Kingdom: Animalia
- Phylum: Arthropoda
- Clade: Pancrustacea
- Class: Insecta
- Order: Hymenoptera
- Family: Megachilidae
- Genus: Anthidium
- Species: A. undulatum

Binomial name
- Anthidium undulatum Dours, 1873

Synonyms
- see text

Species of bee

Anthidium undulatum is a species of bee in the family Megachilidae, the leaf-cutter, carder, or mason bees.

== Synonyms ==
Synonyms for this species include:

- Anthidium littorale Morawitz, 1874
- Proanthidium undulatum holozonium Mavromoustakis, 1939
- Proanthidium undulatum wahrmani Mavromoustakis, 1948
- Anthidium (Proanthidium) undulatum holozonium (Mavromoustakis, 1939)
- Anthidium (Proanthidium) undulatum wahrmani (Mavromoustakis, 1948)
- Anthidium (Proanthidium) undulatum creticum'' Tkalců, 2003
