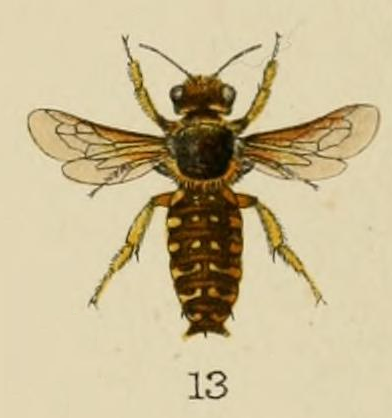
- Charles Thomas Bingham's illustration of a male A. ordinatum.

Scientific classification
- Kingdom: Animalia
- Phylum: Arthropoda
- Clade: Pancrustacea
- Class: Insecta
- Order: Hymenoptera
- Family: Megachilidae
- Genus: Anthidium
- Species: A. ordinatum

Binomial name
- Anthidium ordinatum Smith, 1879

= Anthidium ordinatum =

Species of bee

Anthidium ordinatum is a species of bee in the family Megachilidae, the leaf-cutter, carder, or mason bees. Males can be expected to be 26 millimeters long, while females can be expected to be 20-22 millimeters long.
