= Anthidium rodecki =

Conservation status
- Imperiled (NatureServe)

Scientific classification
- Kingdom: Animalia
- Phylum: Arthropoda
- Clade: Pancrustacea
- Class: Insecta
- Order: Hymenoptera
- Family: Megachilidae
- Genus: Anthidium
- Species: A. rodecki

Binomial name
- Anthidium rodecki Schwarz, 1934

Species of bee

Anthidium rodecki is a species of bee in the family Megachilidae, the leaf-cutter, carder, or mason bees.

== Distribution ==
Southwestern United States.
