= Anthidium friesei =

Scientific classification
- Kingdom: Animalia
- Phylum: Arthropoda
- Clade: Pancrustacea
- Class: Insecta
- Order: Hymenoptera
- Family: Megachilidae
- Genus: Anthidium
- Species: A. friesei

Binomial name
- Anthidium friesei Cockerell, 1911

Synonyms
- see text

Species of bee

Anthidium friesei is a species of bee in the family Megachilidae, the leaf-cutter, carder, or mason bees.

== Synonyms ==
Synonyms for this species include:

- Anthidium flavomaculatum, Cockerell, 1911
- Anthidium flavomaculatum_homonym Friese, 1908
- Anthidium mendocinum Friese, 1917
