= Anthidium emarginatum =

Scientific classification
- Kingdom: Animalia
- Phylum: Arthropoda
- Clade: Pancrustacea
- Class: Insecta
- Order: Hymenoptera
- Family: Megachilidae
- Genus: Anthidium
- Species: A. emarginatum

Binomial name
- Anthidium emarginatum (Say, 1824)

Synonyms
- Megachile emarginata Say, 1824; Anthidium atrifrons Cresson, 1868; Anthidium atriventre Cresson, 1878; Anthidium saxorum Cockerell, 1904; Anthidium collectum var. ultrapictum Cockerell, 1904; Anthidium titusi Cockerell, 1904; Anthidium bernardinum var. aridum Cockerell, 1904; Anthidium astragali Swenk, 1914; Anthidium fresnoense Cockerell, 1925; Anthidium angulatum Cockerell, 1925; Anthidium hamatum Cockerell, 1925; Anthidium spinosum Cockerell, 1925; Anthidium lucidum Cockerell, 1925; Anthidium rhodophorum Cockerell, 1925; Anthidium sculleni Schwarz, 1930

Species of bee

Anthidium emarginatum is a species of bee in the family Megachilidae, the leaf-cutter, carder, or mason bees.

== Distribution ==
North America
