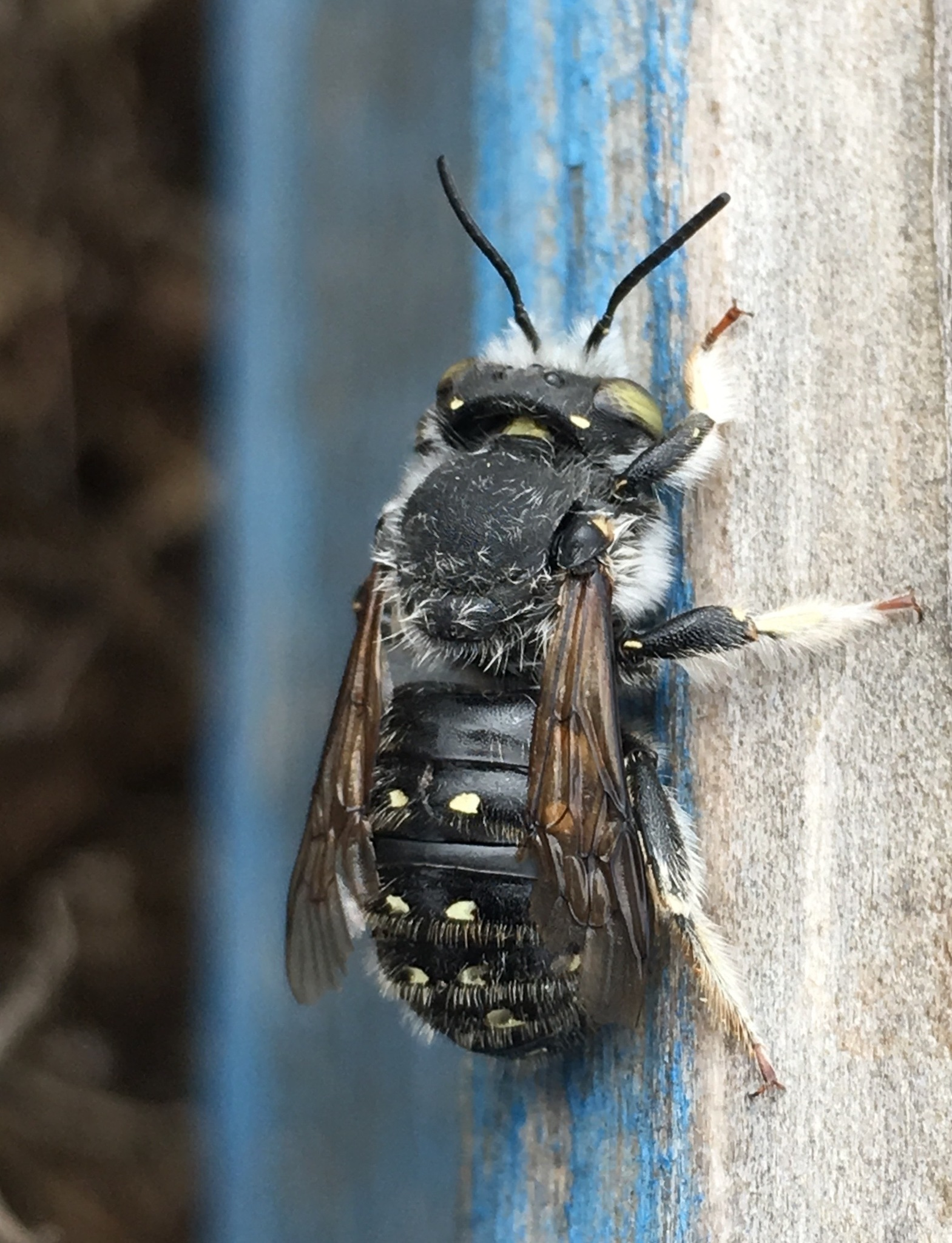

Conservation status
- Vulnerable (NatureServe)

Scientific classification
- Kingdom: Animalia
- Phylum: Arthropoda
- Clade: Pancrustacea
- Class: Insecta
- Order: Hymenoptera
- Family: Megachilidae
- Genus: Anthidium
- Species: A. collectum

Binomial name
- Anthidium collectum Huard, 1896

Synonyms
- see text

= Anthidium collectum =

Species of bee

Anthidium collectum is a species of bee in the family Megachilidae, the leaf-cutter, carder, or mason bees.

== Distribution ==
Middle America and North America

== Synonyms ==
Synonyms for this species include:

- Anthidium compactum_homonym Provancher, 1896
- Anthidium angelarum Titus, 1906
- Anthidium transversum Swenk, 1914
- Anthidium puncticaudum Cockerell, 1925
- Anthidium collectum bilderbacki Cockerell, 1938
- Anthidium catalinense Cockerell, 1939
- Anthidium clementinum Cockerell, 1939
