= Anthidium cordiforme =

Scientific classification
- Kingdom: Animalia
- Phylum: Arthropoda
- Clade: Pancrustacea
- Class: Insecta
- Order: Hymenoptera
- Family: Megachilidae
- Genus: Anthidium
- Species: A. cordiforme

Binomial name
- Anthidium cordiforme Friese, 1922

Synonyms
- See text

Species of bee

Anthidium cordiforme is a diurnal species of winged bee in the family Megachilidae, known as the leafcutting bees. They were first classified by Friese in 1922. The bee is bilaterally symmetric from head to tail, and is holometabolous (undergoes complete metamorphosis, including a pupal stage).

== Distribution ==
- Southern Africa including:
  - Botswana
  - Mozambique
  - Namibia
  - South Africa
  - Zimbabwe

== Synonyms ==
Synonyms for this species include:

- Anthidium severini maculiferum Cockerell, 1936
- Anthidium cordiforme makarikaricum Mavromoustakis, 1936
