= Anthidium albitarse =

Scientific classification
- Kingdom: Animalia
- Phylum: Arthropoda
- Clade: Pancrustacea
- Class: Insecta
- Order: Hymenoptera
- Family: Megachilidae
- Genus: Anthidium
- Species: A. albitarse

Binomial name
- Anthidium albitarse Friese, 1917

Species of bee

Anthidium albitarse is a species of bee in the family Megachilidae, the leaf-cutter, carder, or mason bees.

== Distribution ==
This species is found the tip of North America, in Central America near Panama.
