= Anthidium akermani =

Scientific classification
- Kingdom: Animalia
- Phylum: Arthropoda
- Clade: Pancrustacea
- Class: Insecta
- Order: Hymenoptera
- Family: Megachilidae
- Genus: Anthidium
- Species: A. akermani

Binomial name
- Anthidium akermani Mavromoustakis, 1937

Species of bee

Anthidium akermani is a species of bee in the family Megachilidae, the leaf-cutter, carder, or mason bees.

== Distribution ==
This species is found only in the southern edge of Africa.
