= Anthidium placitum =

Scientific classification
- Kingdom: Animalia
- Phylum: Arthropoda
- Clade: Pancrustacea
- Class: Insecta
- Order: Hymenoptera
- Family: Megachilidae
- Genus: Anthidium
- Species: A. placitum

Binomial name
- Anthidium placitum Cresson, 1879

Synonyms
- see text

Species of bee

Anthidium placitum is a species of bee in the family Megachilidae, the leaf-cutter, carder, or mason bees.

== Distribution ==
North America

== Synonyms ==
Synonyms for this species include:

- Anthidium bernardinum Cockerell, 1904
- Anthidium herperium dentipygum Swenk, 1914
- Anthidium permaculatum Cockerell, 1925
- Anthidium bernardinum var mesaverdense Schwarz, 1927
- Anthidium niveumtarsum Schwarz, 1927
