= Anthidium sanguinicaudum =

Scientific classification
- Kingdom: Animalia
- Phylum: Arthropoda
- Clade: Pancrustacea
- Class: Insecta
- Order: Hymenoptera
- Family: Megachilidae
- Genus: Anthidium
- Species: A. sanguinicaudum

Binomial name
- Anthidium sanguinicaudum Schwarz, 1933

Species of bee

Anthidium sanguinicaudum is a species of bee in the family Megachilidae.

== Distribution ==
- Brazil
- Colombia
- French Guiana
- Suriname
- Venezuela
