= Anthidium jocosum =

Scientific classification
- Kingdom: Animalia
- Phylum: Arthropoda
- Clade: Pancrustacea
- Class: Insecta
- Order: Hymenoptera
- Family: Megachilidae
- Genus: Anthidium
- Species: A. jocosum

Binomial name
- Anthidium jocosum Cresson, 1878

Synonyms
- see text

Species of bee

Anthidium jocosum is a species of bee in the family Megachilidae, the leaf-cutter, carder, or mason bees.

== Synonyms ==
Synonyms for this species include:

- Anthidium xanthognathum Cockerell, 1925
- Anthidium fontis Cockerell, 1925
