= Anthidium danieli =

Scientific classification
- Kingdom: Animalia
- Phylum: Arthropoda
- Clade: Pancrustacea
- Class: Insecta
- Order: Hymenoptera
- Family: Megachilidae
- Genus: Anthidium
- Species: A. danieli

Binomial name
- Anthidium danieli Urban, 2001

Species of bee

Anthidium danieli is a species of bee in the family Megachilidae, the leaf-cutter, carder bee, or mason bees.

== Distribution ==
- Argentina
