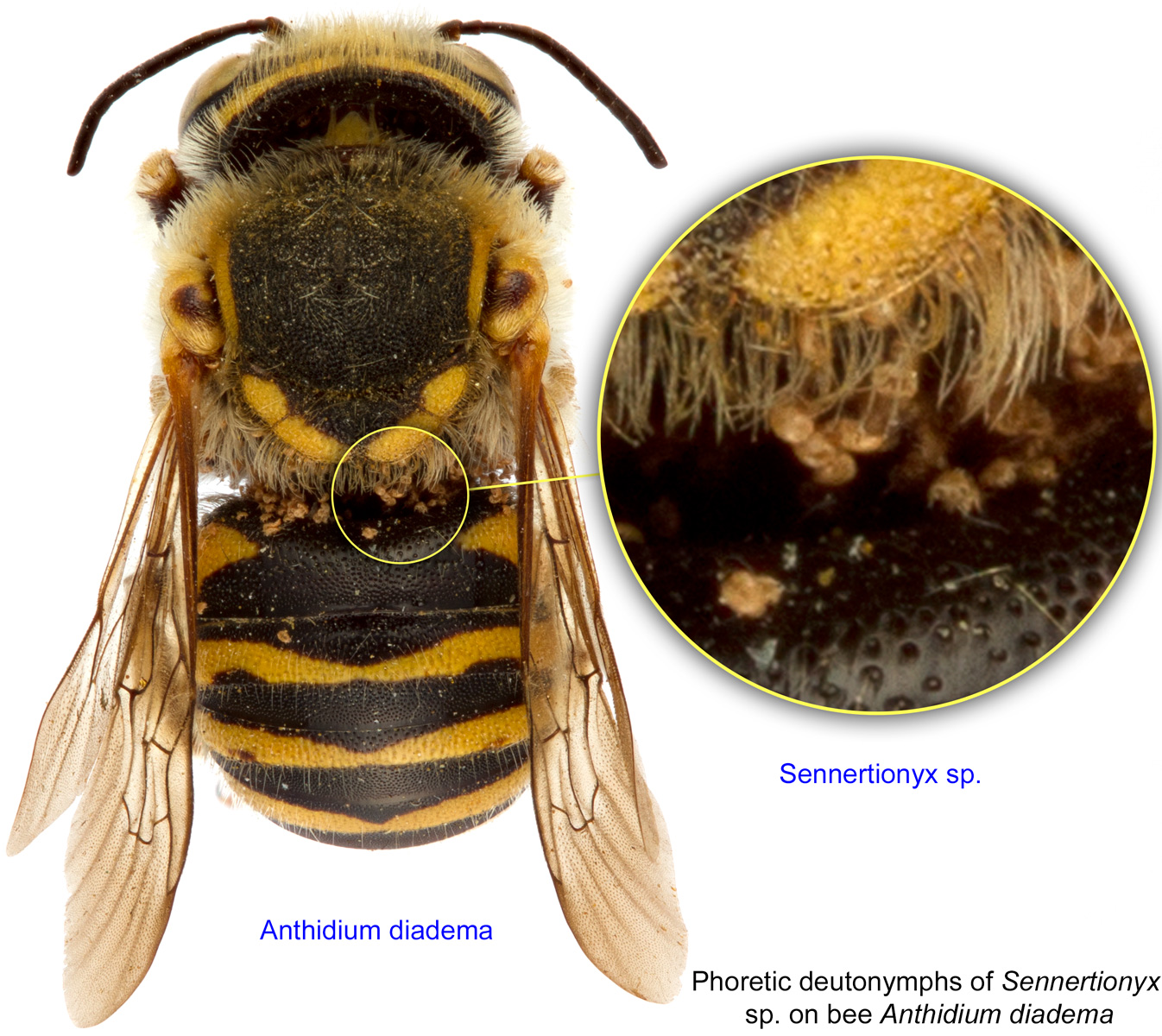

Scientific classification
- Kingdom: Animalia
- Phylum: Arthropoda
- Clade: Pancrustacea
- Class: Insecta
- Order: Hymenoptera
- Family: Megachilidae
- Genus: Anthidium
- Species: A. diadema

Binomial name
- Anthidium diadema Latreille, 1809

Synonyms
- see text

= Anthidium diadema =

Species of bee

Anthidium diadema is a species of bee in the family Megachilidae, the leaf-cutter, carder, or mason bees.

== Synonyms ==
Synonyms for this species include:

- Anthidium albiventre Latreille, 1809
- Anthidium ornatum Lepeletier, 1841
- Anthidium radoszkowskyi Mocsáry, 1887
- Anthidium seraxense Radoszkowski, 1893
- Anthidium terminale_homonym Morawitz, 1894
- Anthidium diadema var obscurum Friese, 1897
- Anthidium diadema var caucasicum_homonym Friese, 1897
