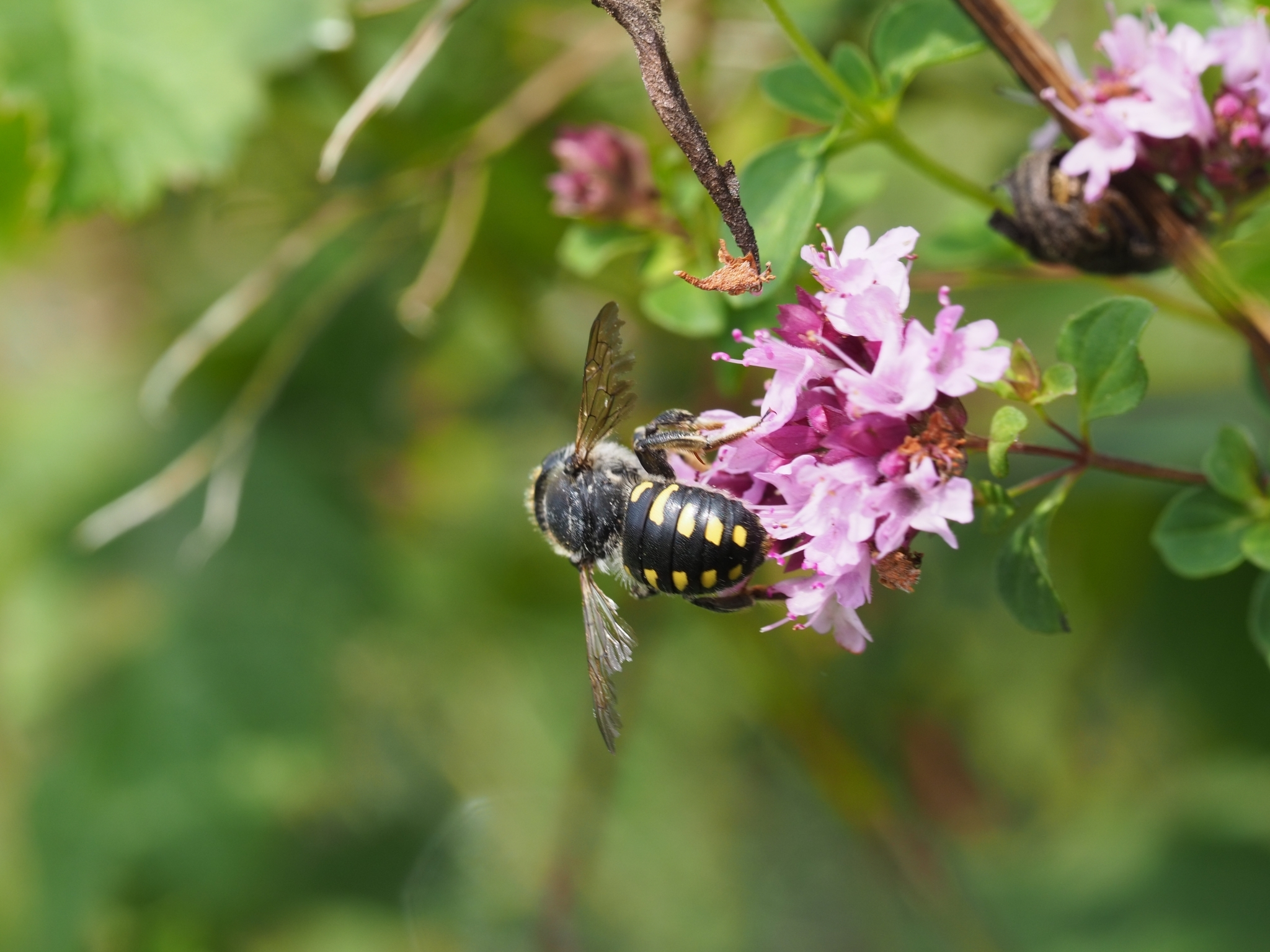

Scientific classification
- Kingdom: Animalia
- Phylum: Arthropoda
- Clade: Pancrustacea
- Class: Insecta
- Order: Hymenoptera
- Family: Megachilidae
- Genus: Anthidium
- Species: A. septemspinosum

Binomial name
- Anthidium septemspinosum Lepeletier, 1841

Synonyms
- List: Anthidium dinurum Cockerell, 1928; Anthidium japonicum Smith, 1879; Anthidium nigriceps Smith, 1854; Anthidium nigripes Eversmann, 1852

= Anthidium septemspinosum =

Species of bee

Anthidium septemspinosum is a species of bee in the family Megachilidae, the leaf-cutter, carder, or mason bees.
