= Anthidium dammersi =

Scientific classification
- Kingdom: Animalia
- Phylum: Arthropoda
- Clade: Pancrustacea
- Class: Insecta
- Order: Hymenoptera
- Family: Megachilidae
- Genus: Anthidium
- Species: A. dammersi

Binomial name
- Anthidium dammersi Cockerell, 1937

Species of bee

Anthidium dammersi is a species of bee in the family Megachilidae, the leaf-cutter, carder, or mason bees.

== Distribution ==
USA: southern California, Arizona to south-western New Mexico, Nevada, Utah, southwestern Wyoming. Also found in Baja California Found in xeric regions, including the Red Desert, Great Basin, Colorado Plateau, and Mojave Desert.
