= Anthidium alticola =

Scientific classification
- Kingdom: Animalia
- Phylum: Arthropoda
- Clade: Pancrustacea
- Class: Insecta
- Order: Hymenoptera
- Family: Megachilidae
- Genus: Anthidium
- Species: A. alticola

Binomial name
- Anthidium alticola Tkalcu, 1967

Synonyms
- Osmia superba Friese, 1920; Anthidium (Melanoanthidium) alticola Tkalců, 1967

Species of bee

Anthidium alticola is a species of bee in the family Megachilidae, the leaf-cutter, carder, or mason bees.
