= Anthidium atripes =

Scientific classification
- Kingdom: Animalia
- Phylum: Arthropoda
- Clade: Pancrustacea
- Class: Insecta
- Order: Hymenoptera
- Family: Megachilidae
- Genus: Anthidium
- Species: A. atripes

Binomial name
- Anthidium atripes Cresson, 1879

Synonyms
- see text

Species of bee

Anthidium atripes is a species of bee in the family Megachilidae, the leaf-cutter, carder, or mason bees.

== Synonyms ==
Synonyms for this species include:

- Anthidium polingae Schwarz, 1931
