= Anthidium rodriguezi =

Scientific classification
- Kingdom: Animalia
- Phylum: Arthropoda
- Clade: Pancrustacea
- Class: Insecta
- Order: Hymenoptera
- Family: Megachilidae
- Genus: Anthidium
- Species: A. rodriguezi

Binomial name
- Anthidium rodriguezi Cockerell, 1912

Synonyms
- see text

Species of insect

Anthidium rodriguezi is a species of bee in the family Megachilidae, the leaf-cutter, carder, or mason bees.

== Distribution ==
- Guatemala
- Honduras
- Mexico

== Distribution ==
Central America

== Synonyms ==
Synonyms for this species include:

- Melanthidium carri Cockerell, 1947
