= Anthidium gayi =

Scientific classification
- Kingdom: Animalia
- Phylum: Arthropoda
- Clade: Pancrustacea
- Class: Insecta
- Order: Hymenoptera
- Family: Megachilidae
- Genus: Anthidium
- Species: A. gayi

Binomial name
- Anthidium gayi Spinola, 1851

Synonyms
- see text

Species of bee

Anthidium gayi is a species of bee in the family Megachilidae, the leaf-cutter, carder, or mason bees.

== Distribution ==
- Argentina
- Chile

== Synonyms ==
Synonyms for this species include:

- Anthidium coloratum Smith, 1854
- Anthidium spinolae Gribodo, 1894
