= Anthidium atricaudum =

Scientific classification
- Kingdom: Animalia
- Phylum: Arthropoda
- Clade: Pancrustacea
- Class: Insecta
- Order: Hymenoptera
- Family: Megachilidae
- Genus: Anthidium
- Species: A. atricaudum

Binomial name
- Anthidium atricaudum Cockerell, 1926

Synonyms
- see text

Species of bee

Anthidium atricaudum is a species of bee in the family Megachilidae, the leaf-cutter, carder, or mason bees.

== Distribution ==
- Chile
- Peru

== Synonyms ==
Synonyms for this species include:

- Anthidium piliventre Friese, 1925 (homonym)
