= Anthidium spiniventre =

Scientific classification
- Kingdom: Animalia
- Phylum: Arthropoda
- Clade: Pancrustacea
- Class: Insecta
- Order: Hymenoptera
- Family: Megachilidae
- Genus: Anthidium
- Species: A. spiniventre

Binomial name
- Anthidium spiniventre Friese, 1899

Synonyms
- see text

Species of bee

Anthidium spiniventre is a species of bee in the family Megachilidae, the leaf-cutter, carder, or mason bees.

== Synonyms ==
Synonyms for this species include:

- Anthidium spiniventre var melanopygum Friese, 1917
- Anthidium (Anthidium) spiniventre melanopygum'' Friese, 1917
