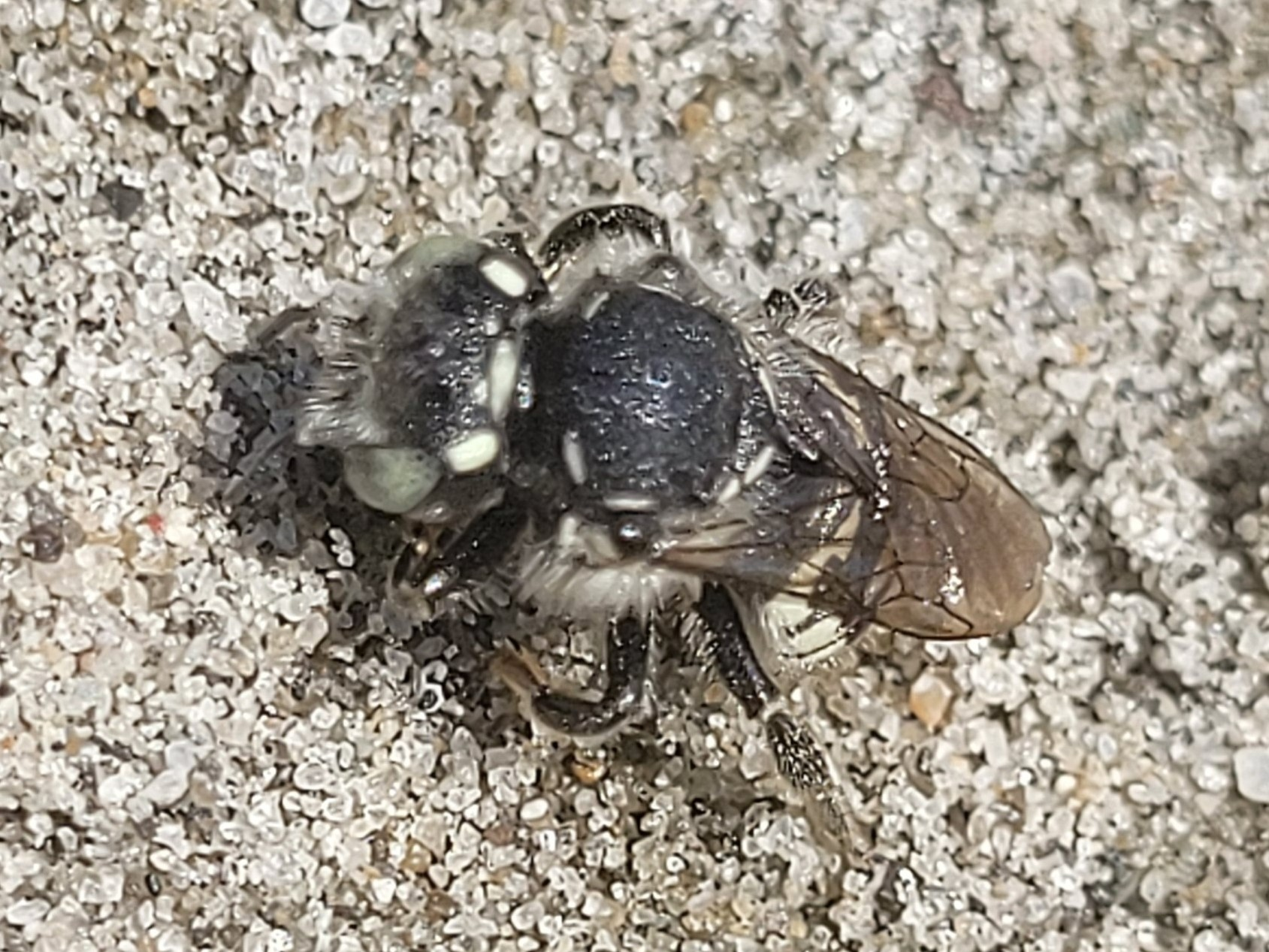

Scientific classification
- Kingdom: Animalia
- Phylum: Arthropoda
- Clade: Pancrustacea
- Class: Insecta
- Order: Hymenoptera
- Family: Megachilidae
- Genus: Anthidium
- Species: A. clypeodentatum

Binomial name
- Anthidium clypeodentatum Swenk, 1914

Synonyms
- Anthidium incurvatum Swenk, 1914; Anthidium emarginatum var bilineatum Schwarz, 1927; Anthidium clypeodentatum var lutzi Schwarz, 1928

= Anthidium clypeodentatum =

Species of bee

Anthidium clypeodentatum is a species of bee in the family Megachilidae, the leaf-cutter, carder, or mason bees.

== Distribution ==
Central and North America
