= Anthidium sichuanense =

Scientific classification
- Kingdom: Animalia
- Phylum: Arthropoda
- Clade: Pancrustacea
- Class: Insecta
- Order: Hymenoptera
- Family: Megachilidae
- Genus: Anthidium
- Species: A. sichuanense

Binomial name
- Anthidium sichuanense Wu, 1992

Synonyms
- Anthidium sichuanensis, Wu, 1992

Species of bee

Anthidium sichuanense is a species of bee in the family Megachilidae, the leaf-cutter, carder, or mason bees.

== Distribution ==
Southern Asia
