= Anthidium soikai =

Scientific classification
- Kingdom: Animalia
- Phylum: Arthropoda
- Clade: Pancrustacea
- Class: Insecta
- Order: Hymenoptera
- Family: Megachilidae
- Genus: Anthidium
- Species: A. soikai

Binomial name
- Anthidium soikai Mavromoustakis, 1968

Species of bee

Anthidium soikai is a species of bee in the family Megachilidae, the leaf-cutter, carder, or mason bees.
