= Anthidium cingulatum =

Scientific classification
- Kingdom: Animalia
- Phylum: Arthropoda
- Class: Insecta
- Order: Hymenoptera
- Family: Megachilidae
- Genus: Anthidium
- Species: A. cingulatum

Binomial name
- Anthidium cingulatum Latreille, 1809

Synonyms
- Anthidium oraniense Lepeletier, 1841; Anthidium dissectum Eversmann, 1852; Anthidium imitator Smith, 1879; Anthidium rufispinum Costa, 1883

Species of bee

Anthidium cingulatum is a species of bee in the family Megachilidae, the leaf-cutter bees or mason bees which is found in south and central Europe east to Siberia and south to North Africa and Iran. It feeds on the nectar and pollen of plants in the families Asteraceae, Fabaceae and Lamiaceae while males have been recorded as pollinators of the lizard orchid Himantoglossum caprinum in Crimea.
