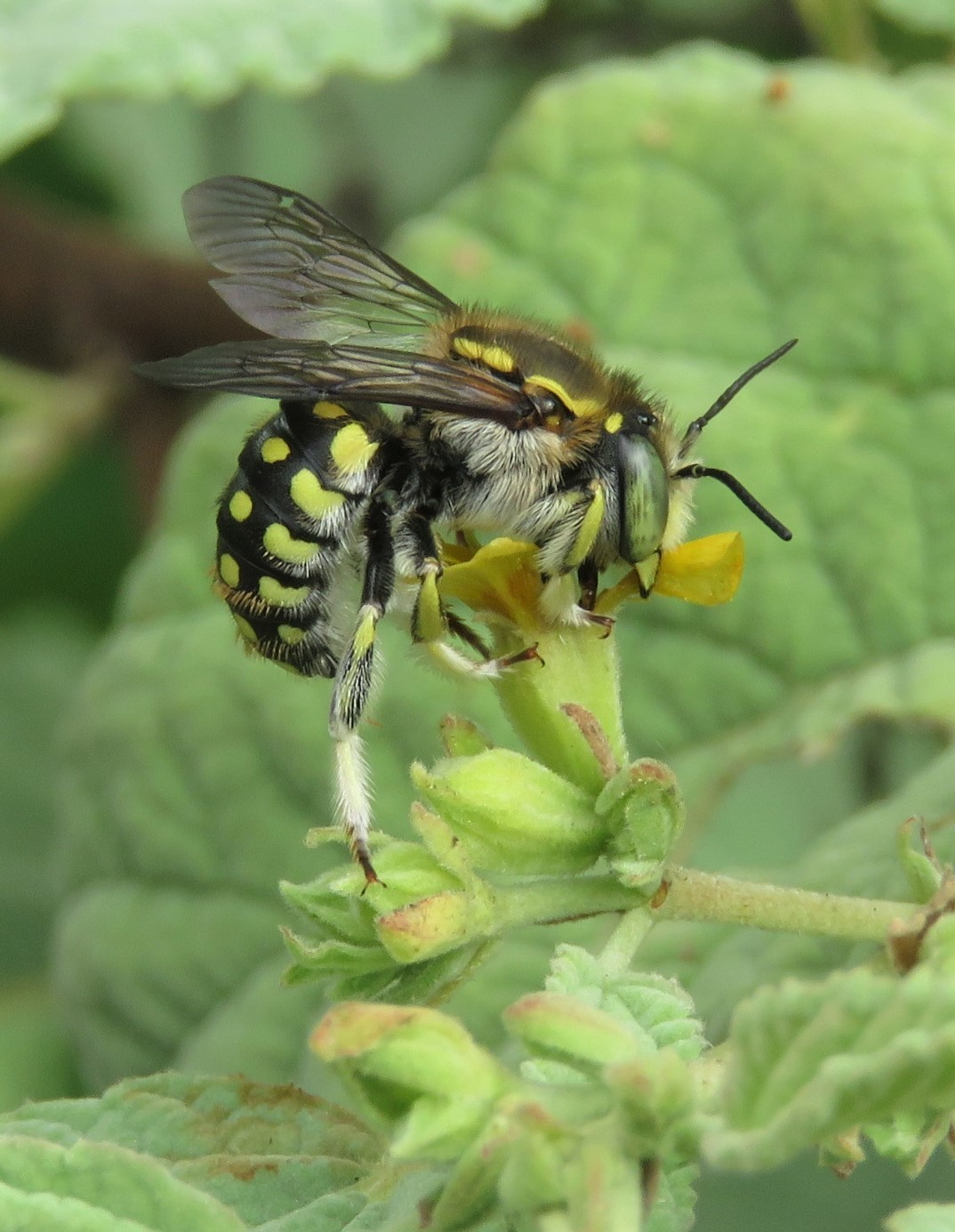

Scientific classification
- Kingdom: Animalia
- Phylum: Arthropoda
- Clade: Pancrustacea
- Class: Insecta
- Order: Hymenoptera
- Family: Megachilidae
- Genus: Anthidium
- Species: A. vigintiduopunctatum

Binomial name
- Anthidium vigintiduopunctatum Friese, 1904

= Anthidium vigintiduopunctatum =

Species of bee

Anthidium vigintiduopunctatum, also called the twenty-two-spotted woolcarder, is a species of bee in the family Megachilidae, the leaf-cutter, carder, or mason bees.

== Distribution ==
- Argentina
- Ecuador
- Peru
