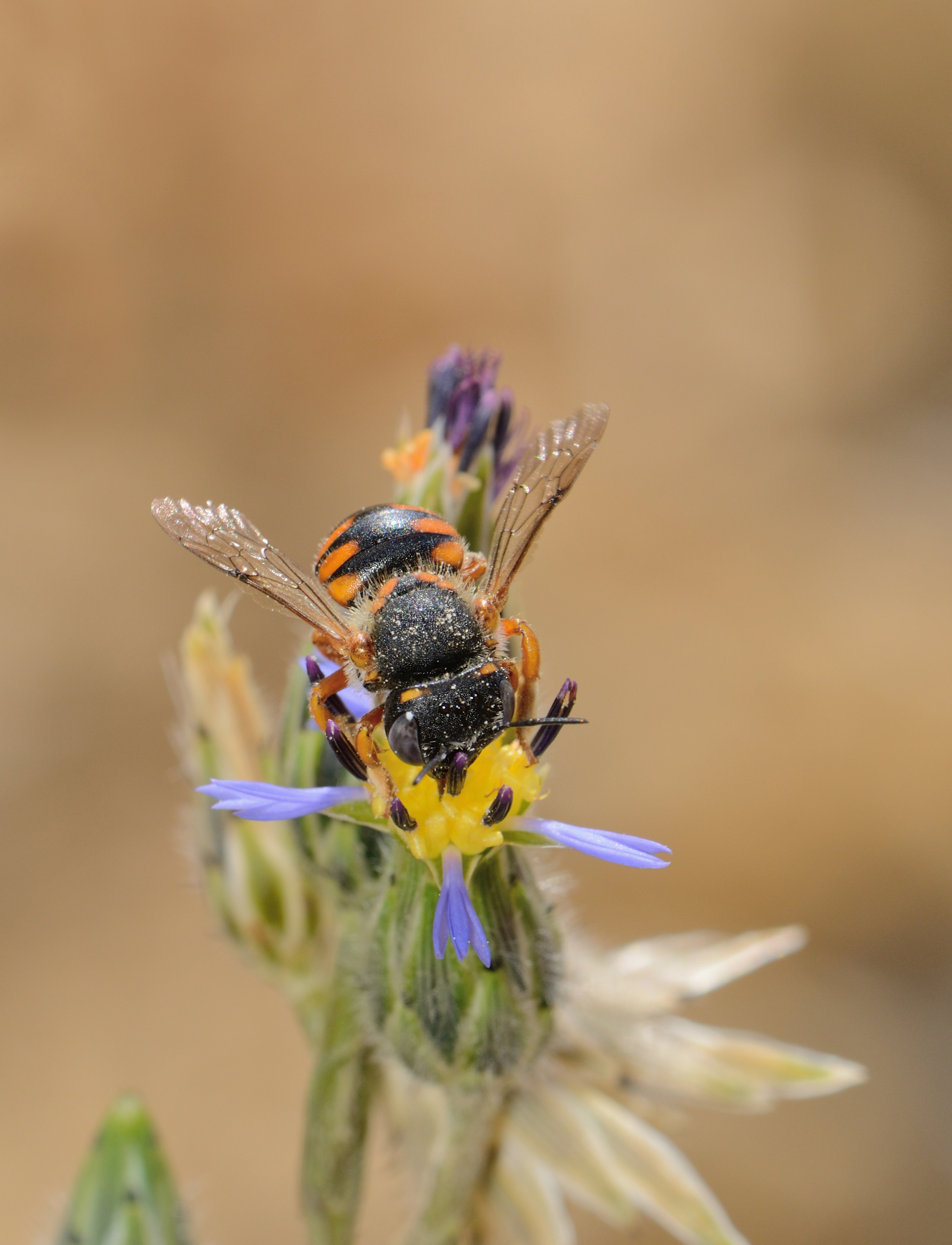

Scientific classification
- Kingdom: Animalia
- Phylum: Arthropoda
- Clade: Pancrustacea
- Class: Insecta
- Order: Hymenoptera
- Family: Megachilidae
- Genus: Anthidium
- Species: A. auritum

Binomial name
- Anthidium auritum Klug, 1832

Synonyms
- see text

= Anthidium auritum =

Species of bee

Anthidium auritum is a species of bee in the family Megachilidae, the leaf-cutter, carder, or mason bees.

== Synonyms ==
Synonyms for this species include:

- Anthidium fischeri Spinola, 1838
- Anthidium rufomaculatum Friese, 1899
