= Anthidium severini =

Scientific classification
- Kingdom: Animalia
- Phylum: Arthropoda
- Clade: Pancrustacea
- Class: Insecta
- Order: Hymenoptera
- Family: Megachilidae
- Genus: Anthidium
- Species: A. severini

Binomial name
- Anthidium severini Vachal, 1903

Synonyms
- see text

Species of bee

Anthidium severini is a species of bee in the family Megachilidae, the leaf-cutter, carder, or mason bees.

== Distribution ==
Africa

== Synonyms ==
Synonyms for this species include:

- Anthidium severini daressalamicum Strand, 1922
- Anthidium kobrowi Brauns, 1912
- Anthidium maximum Friese, 1922
- Anthidium michaelis Cockerell, 1930
- Anthidium severini melanaspis Cockerell, 1936
- Anthidium severini eriksoni Mavromoustakis, 1940
