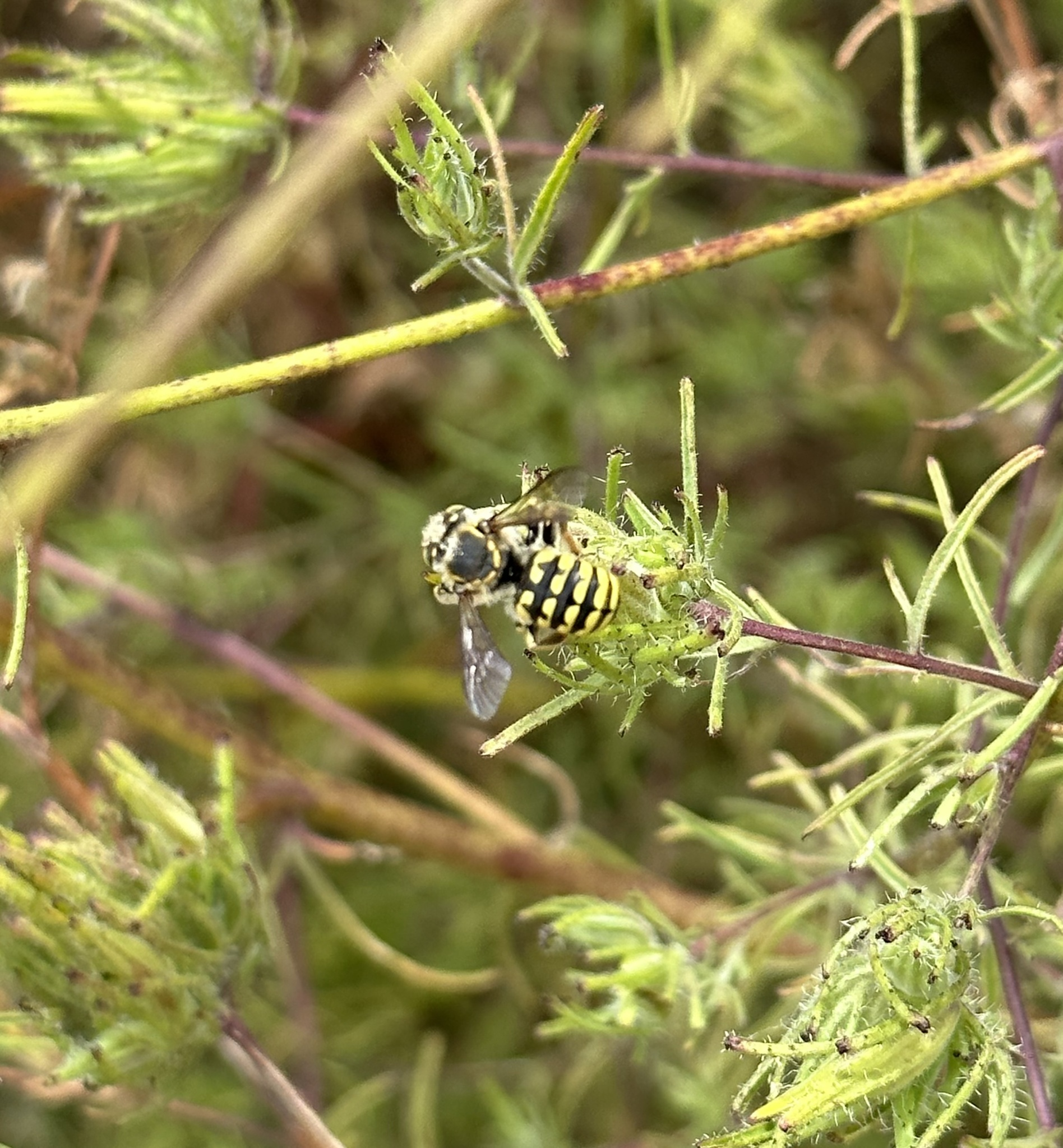

Conservation status
- Vulnerable (NatureServe)

Scientific classification
- Kingdom: Animalia
- Phylum: Arthropoda
- Clade: Pancrustacea
- Class: Insecta
- Order: Hymenoptera
- Family: Megachilidae
- Genus: Anthidium
- Species: A. edwardsii

Binomial name
- Anthidium edwardsii Cresson, 1878

Synonyms
- see text

= Anthidium edwardsii =

Species of bee

Anthidium edwardsii is a species of bee in the family Megachilidae, the leaf-cutter, carder, or mason bees.

== Synonyms ==
Synonyms for this species include:

- Anthidium tricuspidum Provancher, 1896
- Anthidium hesperium Swenk, 1914
- Anthidium depressum Schwarz, 1927
