= Anthidium latum =

Scientific classification
- Kingdom: Animalia
- Phylum: Arthropoda
- Clade: Pancrustacea
- Class: Insecta
- Order: Hymenoptera
- Family: Megachilidae
- Genus: Anthidium
- Species: A. latum

Binomial name
- Anthidium latum Schrottky, 1902

Synonyms
- see text

Species of bee

Anthidium latum is a species of bee in the family Megachilidae, the leaf-cutter, carder, or mason bees.

== Distribution ==
- Argentina
- Brazil
- Paraguay

== Synonyms ==
Synonyms for this species include:

- Anthidium codoense Ducke, 1907
- Anthidium cingulatum Friese, 1909
- Anthidium insignissimum Strand, 1910
- Anthidium latum var asuncionanum Strand, 1910
- Anthidium variegatipes Cockerell, 1927
- Tetranthidium latum (Schrottky, 1902)
