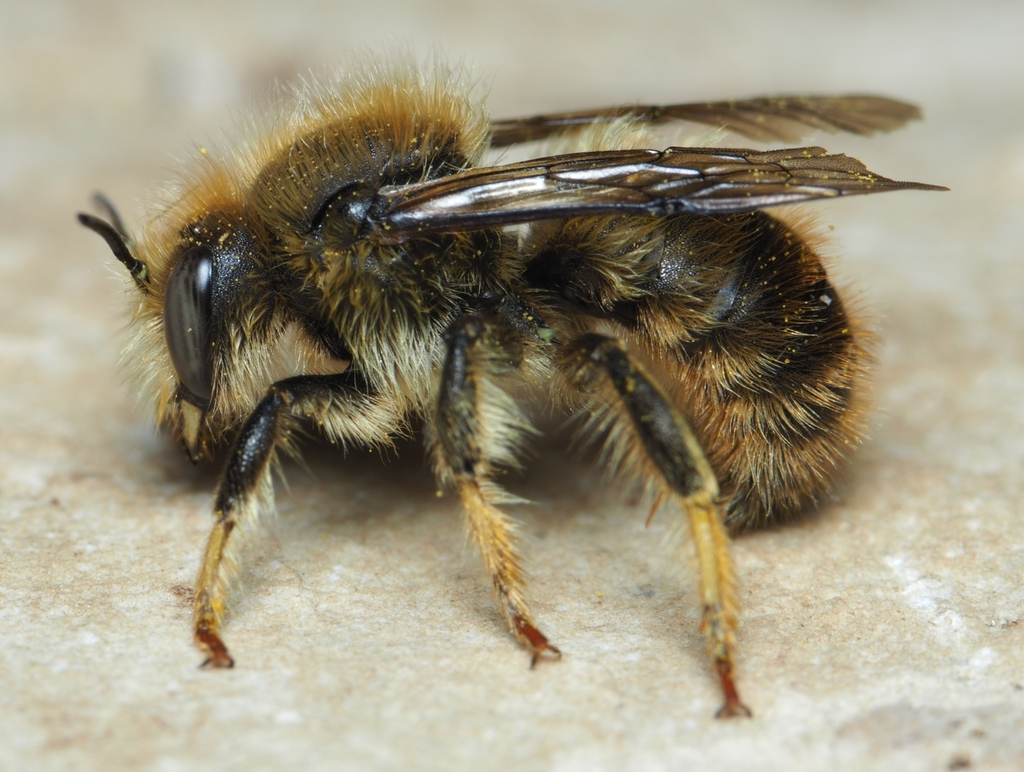

Scientific classification
- Kingdom: Animalia
- Phylum: Arthropoda
- Clade: Pancrustacea
- Class: Insecta
- Order: Hymenoptera
- Family: Megachilidae
- Genus: Anthidium
- Species: A. montanum

Binomial name
- Anthidium montanum Morawitz, 1864

Synonyms
- see text

= Anthidium montanum =

Species of bee

Anthidium montanum is a species of bee in the family Megachilidae, the leaf-cutter, carder, or mason bees.

== Distribution ==
It is known from Spain, France, Germany, Switzerland, Austria, Italy, Slovenia, Slovakia, Poland, north-western and southern Russia.

== Synonyms ==
Synonyms for this species include:

- Anthidium montanum var flavomaculatum Friese, 1897
- Anthidium (Melanoanthidium) montanum Morawitz, 1865 ["1864"]
