= Anthidium senile =

Scientific classification
- Kingdom: Animalia
- Phylum: Arthropoda
- Clade: Pancrustacea
- Class: Insecta
- Order: Hymenoptera
- Family: Megachilidae
- Genus: Anthidium
- Species: A. senile

Binomial name
- Anthidium senile Eversmann, 1852

Synonyms
- Anthidium baicalense, Eversmann, 1852

Species of bee

Anthidium senile is a species of bee in the family Megachilidae, the leaf-cutter, carder, or mason bees. It is found in the eastern Mediterranean region, specifically from the northeastern Adriatic coast across Bulgaria, Greece, Turkey, and further to the Caucasus, Iran, and the Levant.
