= Anthidium funereum =

Scientific classification
- Kingdom: Animalia
- Phylum: Arthropoda
- Clade: Pancrustacea
- Class: Insecta
- Order: Hymenoptera
- Family: Megachilidae
- Genus: Anthidium
- Species: A. funereum

Binomial name
- Anthidium funereum Schletterer, 1890

Synonyms
- see text

Species of bee

Anthidium funereum is a species of bee in the family Megachilidae, the leaf-cutter, carder, or mason bees.

== Distribution ==
- Argentina
- Chile

== Synonyms ==
Synonyms for this species include:

- Anthidium melanotrichum Friese, 1904
- Anthidium bombiforme Friese, 1920
- Anthidium aterrimum Friese, 1925
- Anthidium ruizi Reed, 1930
