= Anthidium andinum =

Scientific classification
- Kingdom: Animalia
- Phylum: Arthropoda
- Clade: Pancrustacea
- Class: Insecta
- Order: Hymenoptera
- Family: Megachilidae
- Genus: Anthidium
- Species: A. andinum

Binomial name
- Anthidium andinum Jörgensen, 1912

Species of insect

Anthidium andinum is a species of bee in the family Megachilidae, the leaf-cutter, carder, or mason bees. It was first described by Peter Jörgensen in 1912.

== Distribution ==
- Argentina
