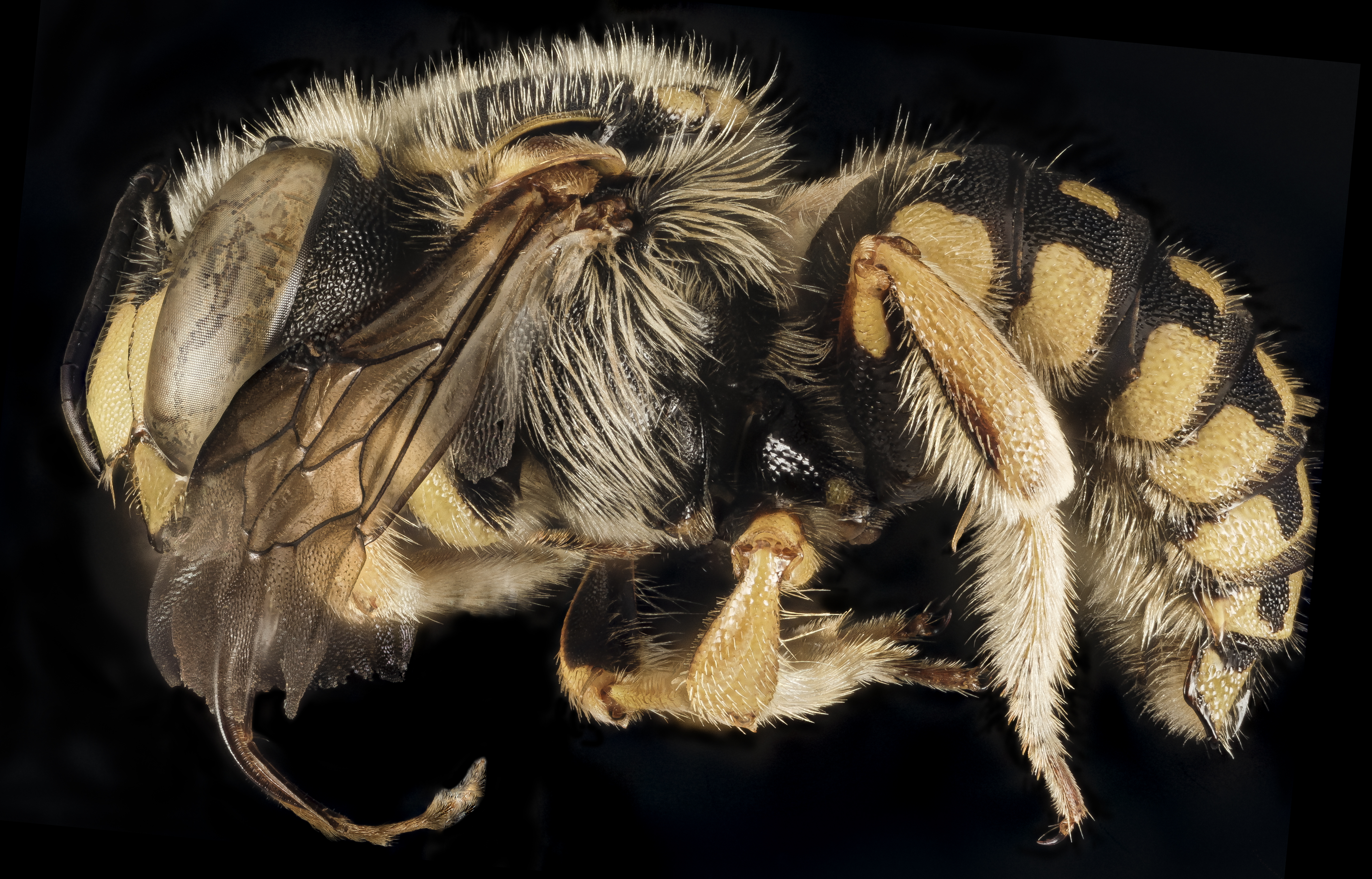

Scientific classification
- Kingdom: Animalia
- Phylum: Arthropoda
- Clade: Pancrustacea
- Class: Insecta
- Order: Hymenoptera
- Family: Megachilidae
- Genus: Anthidium
- Species: A. loti

Binomial name
- Anthidium loti Perris, 1852

Synonyms
- see text

= Anthidium loti =

Species of bee

Anthidium loti is a Palearctic species of bee in the family Megachilidae, the leaf-cutter, carder, or mason bees.

== Synonyms ==
Synonyms for this species include:

- Apis variegata_homonym Fabricius, 1781
- Apis varia_homonym Gmelin, 1790
- Anthidium regulare Eversmann, 1852
- Anthidium mosaicum Costa, 1863
- Anthidium meridionale Giraud, 1863
- Anthidium quadriseriatum Kriechbaumer, 1873
- Anthidium variegatum var meridionale Giraud, 1863
- Anthidium (Anthidium) loti meridionale Giraud, 1863
