= Anthidium garleppi =

Scientific classification
- Kingdom: Animalia
- Phylum: Arthropoda
- Clade: Pancrustacea
- Class: Insecta
- Order: Hymenoptera
- Family: Megachilidae
- Genus: Anthidium
- Species: A. garleppi

Binomial name
- Anthidium garleppi Schrottky, 1910

Synonyms
- see text

Species of bee

Anthidium garleppi is a species of bee in the family Megachilidae, the leaf-cutter, carder, or mason bees.

== Distribution ==
- Bolivia
- Ecuador
- Peru

== Synonyms ==
Synonyms for this species include:

- Anthidium matucanense Cockerell, 1914
- Anthidium melanotrichum var griseopilosum Friese, 1920
