= Anthidium abjunctum =

Scientific classification
- Kingdom: Animalia
- Phylum: Arthropoda
- Clade: Pancrustacea
- Class: Insecta
- Order: Hymenoptera
- Family: Megachilidae
- Genus: Anthidium
- Species: A. abjunctum

Binomial name
- Anthidium abjunctum (Cockerell, 1936)

Synonyms
- Pachyanthidium severini abjunctum Cockerell, 1936

Species of bee

Anthidium abjunctum is a species of bee in the family Megachilidae, the leaf-cutter, carder, or mason bees.

== Distribution ==
This species of Megachilidae can be found in mid or central Africa.
