= Anthidium philorum =

Scientific classification
- Kingdom: Animalia
- Phylum: Arthropoda
- Clade: Pancrustacea
- Class: Insecta
- Order: Hymenoptera
- Family: Megachilidae
- Genus: Anthidium
- Species: A. philorum

Binomial name
- Anthidium philorum Cockerell, 1910

Synonyms
- see text

Species of bee

Anthidium philorum is a species of bee in the family Megachilidae, the leaf-cutter, carder, or mason bees.

== Synonyms ==
Synonyms for this species include:

- Anthidium philorum var abbotti Cockerell, 1911
