= Anthidium bechualandicum =

Scientific classification
- Kingdom: Animalia
- Phylum: Arthropoda
- Clade: Pancrustacea
- Class: Insecta
- Order: Hymenoptera
- Family: Megachilidae
- Genus: Anthidium
- Species: A. bechualandicum

Binomial name
- Anthidium bechualandicum Mavromoustakis, 1939

Synonyms
- see text

Species of bee

Anthidium bechualandicum is a species of bee in the family Megachilidae, the leaf-cutter, carder, or mason bees.

== Synonyms ==
Synonyms for this species include:

- Anthidium michaelis bechuanlandicum Mavromoustakis, 1939
