= Anthidium formosum =

Scientific classification
- Kingdom: Animalia
- Phylum: Arthropoda
- Clade: Pancrustacea
- Class: Insecta
- Order: Hymenoptera
- Family: Megachilidae
- Genus: Anthidium
- Species: A. formosum

Binomial name
- Anthidium formosum Cresson, 1878

Synonyms
- see text

Species of bee

Anthidium formosum is a species of bee in the family Megachilidae, the leaf-cutter, carder, or mason bees.

== Distribution ==
North America

== Synonyms ==
Synonyms for this species include:

- Anthidium conspicuum Cresson, 1879
- Anthidium illustre var consonum Cresson, 1879
- Dianthidium balli Titus, 1902
- Callanthidium formosum (Cresson, 1878)
- Callanthidium formosum pratense Cockerell, 1925
