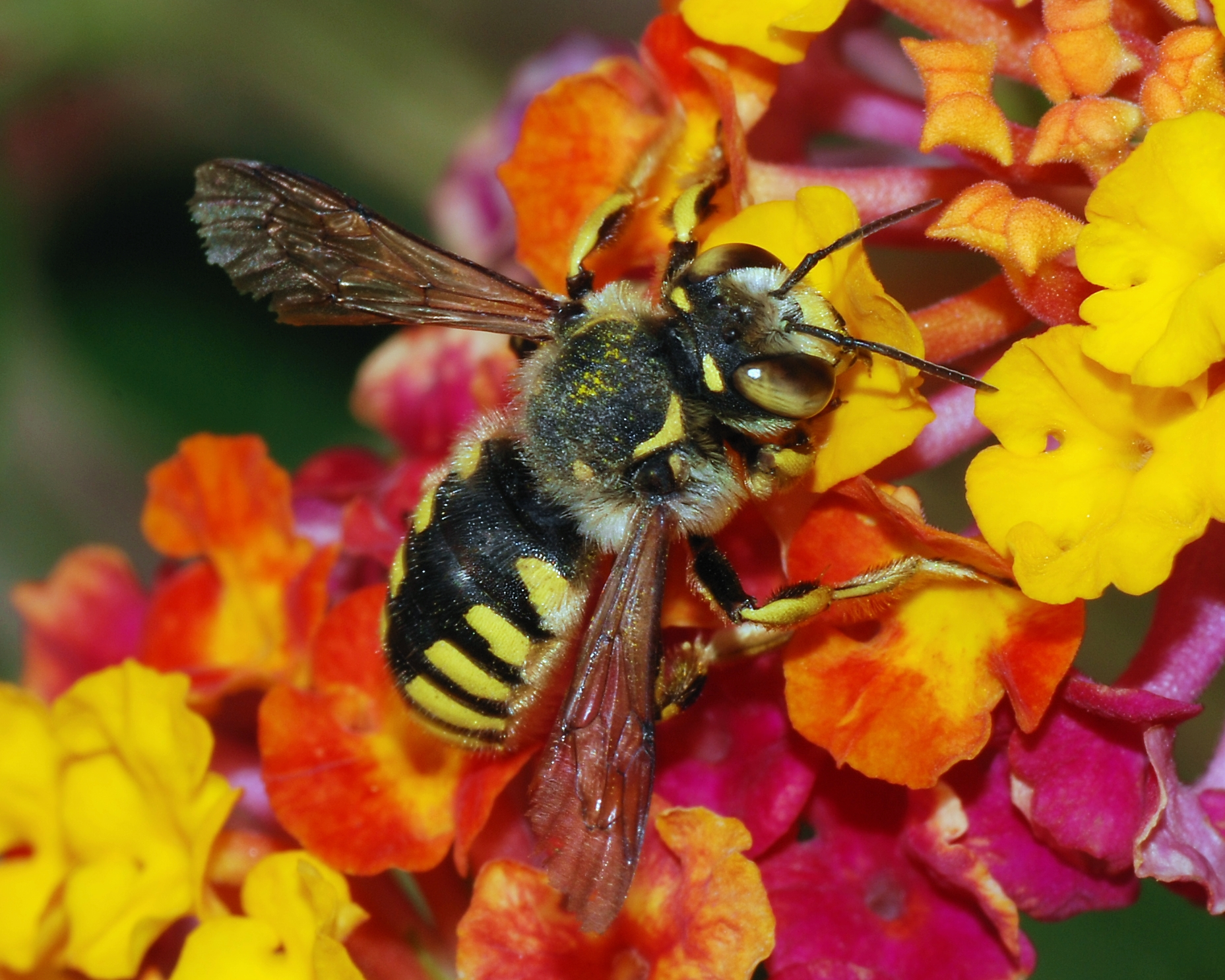
- Anthidium florentinum

Scientific classification
- Kingdom: Animalia
- Phylum: Arthropoda
- Clade: Pancrustacea
- Class: Insecta
- Order: Hymenoptera
- Family: Megachilidae
- Tribe: Anthidiini
- Genus: Anthidium; Fabricius, 1805

Type species
- Apis manicata Linnaeus, 1758

= Anthidium =

Anthidium Temporal range: Priabonian to Recent

Genus of bees

Anthidium is a genus of bees often called carder or potter bees, who do not cut leaves, but use conifer resin, plant hairs, mud, or a mix of them to build nests. Like other members of the family Megachilidae (most of which are called "leafcutter bees"), they are solitary bees with pollen-carrying scopa that are only located on the ventral surface of the abdomen (other bee families have pollen-carrying structures on the hind legs). The ~80 species are distributed primarily in the Northern Hemisphere, and South America.

== Description ==
Most Anthidium species have cream to yellow abdominal bands, typically interrupted in the middle. There is no lobe (arolium) between their claws. Anthidium manicatum, commonly known as the wool carder bee, uses comblike mandibles to "comb" plant fibers into its brood cell walls. It has spread from Europe to North and South America. The males are much larger (ca. 18 mm) than the females (ca.12 mm) which is not uncommon among Megachilidae, but very rare among other bee families. Anthidium manicatum males also have three "thorns" at their abdominal apex which they use as weapons when defending their territory. Anthidium florentinum is one of the more common European species; this species flies all summer and makes nests in holes in the ground, walls or trees, with hairs plucked from plants.

Members of Anthidium and several related genera are unusual among solitary bees, in that there are more females than males, males are territorial and bigger than females, and the sexes fly at the same times of year. It has been suggested that this pattern is explained by the prolonged sexual receptivity of the females, along with the males' use of readily defended resources in their territories.

== Extant species (selected) ==
- Anthidium abjunctum
- Anthidium afghanistanicum
- Anthidium akermani
- Anthidium albitarse
- Anthidium alsinai
- Anthidium alticola
- Anthidium amabile
- Anthidium amurense
- Anthidium andinum
- Anthidium anguliventre
- Anthidium anurospilum
- Anthidium ardens
- Anthidium armatum
- Anthidium atricaudum
- Anthidium atripes
- Anthidium auritum
- Anthidium aymara
- Anthidium aztecum
- Anthidium banningense
- Anthidium basale
- Anthidium bechualandicum
- Anthidium berbericum
- Anthidium bifidum
- Anthidium bischoffi
- Anthidium brevithorace
- Anthidium callosum
- Anthidium caspicum
- Anthidium chilense
- Anthidium christianseni
- Anthidium chubuti
- Anthidium cingulatum
- Anthidium clypeodentatum
- Anthidium cochimi
- Anthidium cockerelli
- Anthidium collectum
- Anthidium colliguayanum
- Anthidium conciliatum
- Anthidium cordiforme
- Anthidium cuzcoense
- Anthidium dalmaticum
- Anthidium dammersi
- Anthidium danieli
- Anthidium decaspilum
- Anthidium deceptum
- Anthidium diadema
- Anthidium echinatum
- Anthidium edwardsii
- Anthidium edwini
- Anthidium emarginatum
- Anthidium eremicum
- Anthidium espinosai
- Anthidium falsificum
- Anthidium flavorufum
- Anthidium flavotarsum
- Anthidium florentinum
- Anthidium formosum
- Anthidium friesei
- Anthidium fulviventre
- Anthidium funereum
- Anthidium furcatum
- Anthidium garleppi
- Anthidium gayi
- Anthidium gratum
- Anthidium gussakovskiji
- Anthidium hallinani
- Anthidium helianthinum
- Anthidium himalayense
- Anthidium igori
- Anthidium illustre
- Anthidium incertum
- Anthidium isabelae
- Anthidium jocosum
- Anthidium kashgarense
- Anthidium kashmirense
- Anthidium klapperichi
- Anthidium kvakicum
- Anthidium laeve
- Anthidium larocai
- Anthidium latum
- Anthidium loboguerrero
- Anthidium longstaffi
- Anthidium loti
- Anthidium luctuosum
- Anthidium luizae
- Anthidium maculifrons
- Anthidium maculosum
- Anthidium manicatum
- Anthidium masunariae
- Anthidium montanum
- Anthidium montivagum
- Anthidium mormonum
- Anthidium nigerrimum
- Anthidium nigroventrale
- Anthidium niveocinctum
- Anthidium nursei
- Anthidium oblongatum
- Anthidium opacum
- Anthidium ordinatum
- Anthidium paitense
- Anthidium pallidiclypeum
- Anthidium palliventre
- Anthidium palmarum
- Anthidium paroselae
- Anthidium penai
- Anthidium peruvianum
- Anthidium philorum
- Anthidium placitum
- Anthidium politum
- Anthidium pontis
- Anthidium porterae
- Anthidium psoraleae
- Anthidium pulchellum
- Anthidium pullatum
- Anthidium punctatum
- Anthidium quetzalcoatli
- Anthidium rafaeli
- Anthidium rodecki
- Anthidium rodriguezi
- Anthidium rotundoscutellare
- Anthidium rotundum
- Anthidium rozeni
- Anthidium rubricans
- Anthidium rubripes
- Anthidium rubrozonatum
- Anthidium rufitarse
- Anthidium sanguinicaudum
- Anthidium semicirculare
- Anthidium senile
- Anthidium septemspinosum
- Anthidium sertanicola
- Anthidium severini
- Anthidium sichuanense
- Anthidium sikkimense
- Anthidium sinuatellum
- Anthidium soikai
- Anthidium soni
- Anthidium sonorense
- Anthidium spiniventre
- Anthidium striatum
- Anthidium sublustre
- Anthidium sudanicum
- Anthidium syriacum
- Anthidium taeniatum
- Anthidium tarsoi
- Anthidium taschenbergi
- Anthidium tenuiflorae
- Anthidium tergomarginatum
- Anthidium ternarium
- Anthidium tesselatum
- Anthidium thomsoni
- Anthidium toro
- Anthidium undulatiforme
- Anthidium undulatum
- Anthidium unicum
- Anthidium utahense
- Anthidium venustum
- Anthidium vigintiduopunctatum
- Anthidium vigintipunctatum
- Anthidium weyrauchi
- Anthidium wuestneii
- Anthidium zadaense

== Fossil species ==
Four species have been described from the fossil record. The oldest species date from the Priabonian to Rupelian deposits of the Florissant Formation, Colorado.

- †Anthidium basalticum Zhang, 1989
- †Anthidium exhumatum Cockerell, 1906
- †Anthidium mortuum (Meunier, 1920)
- †Anthidium scudderi Cockerell, 1906
