= Anthidium palmarum =

Scientific classification
- Kingdom: Animalia
- Phylum: Arthropoda
- Clade: Pancrustacea
- Class: Insecta
- Order: Hymenoptera
- Family: Megachilidae
- Genus: Anthidium
- Species: A. palmarum

Binomial name
- Anthidium palmarum Cockerell, 1904

Synonyms
- see text

Species of bee

Anthidium palmarum is a species of bee in the family Megachilidae, the leaf-cutter, carder, or mason bees.

== Distribution ==
Middle America and North America

== Synonyms ==
Synonyms for this species include:

- Anthidium palmarum micheneri Schwarz, 1957
