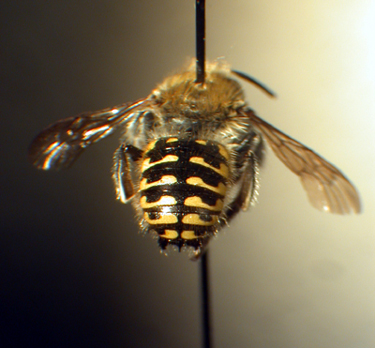
- Female Anthidium palliventre

Conservation status
- Imperiled (NatureServe)

Scientific classification
- Kingdom: Animalia
- Phylum: Arthropoda
- Clade: Pancrustacea
- Class: Insecta
- Order: Hymenoptera
- Family: Megachilidae
- Genus: Anthidium
- Species: A. palliventre

Binomial name
- Anthidium palliventre Cresson, 1878

Synonyms
- see text

= Anthidium palliventre =

Species of bee

Anthidium palliventre is a species of bee in the family Megachilidae, the leaf-cutter, carder, or mason bees.

== Synonyms ==
Synonyms for this species include:

- Anthidium pallidiventre Dalla Torre, 1896, emend
- Anthidium californicum Cresson, 1879
- Anthidium palliventre vanduzeei Cockerell, 1937
