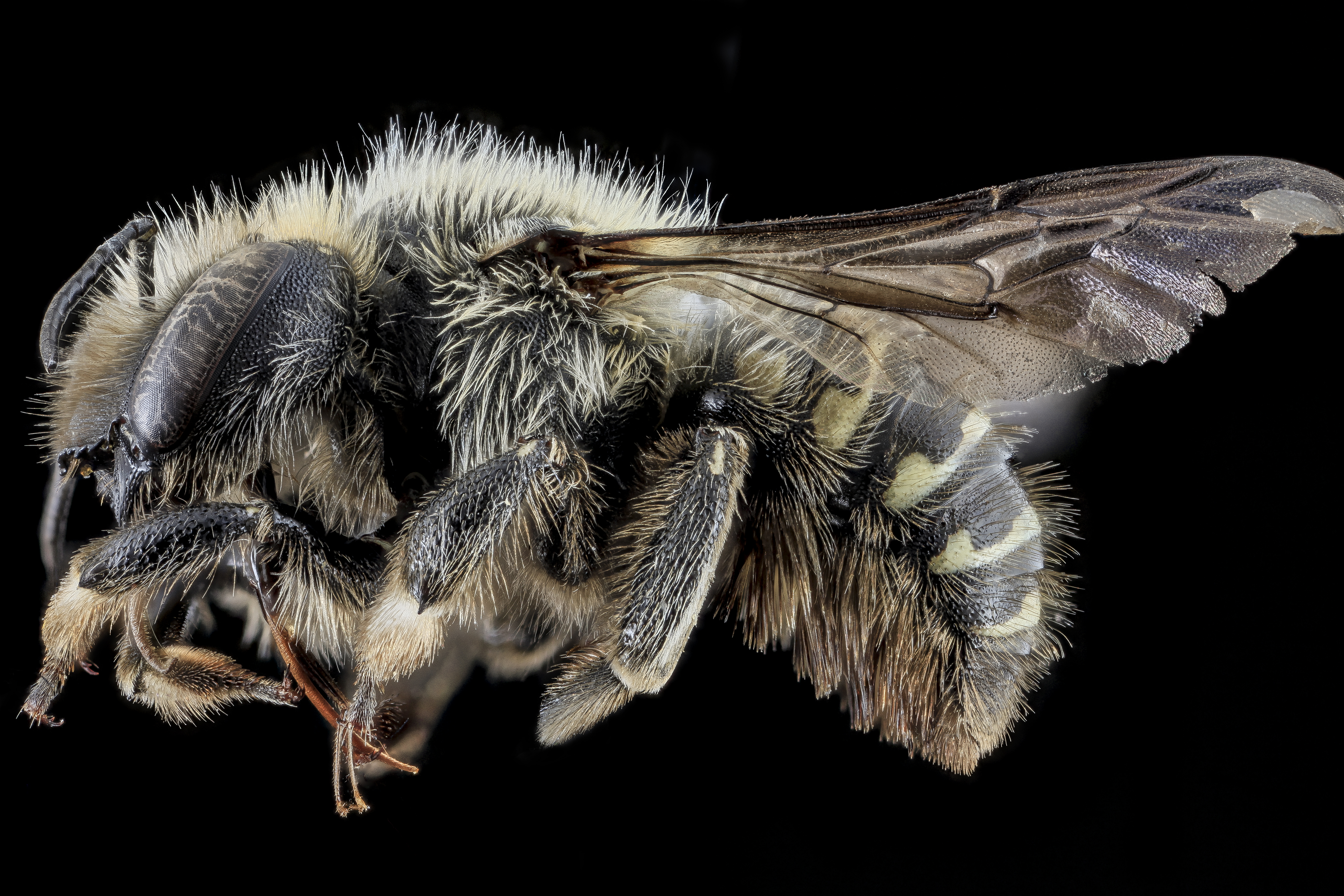

Scientific classification
- Kingdom: Animalia
- Phylum: Arthropoda
- Clade: Pancrustacea
- Class: Insecta
- Order: Hymenoptera
- Family: Megachilidae
- Genus: Anthidium
- Species: A. tenuiflorae

Binomial name
- Anthidium tenuiflorae Cockerell, 1907

Synonyms
- see text

= Anthidium tenuiflorae =

Species of bee

Anthidium tenuiflorae is a species of bee in the family Megachilidae, the leaf-cutter, carder, or mason bees.

== Distribution ==
Middle America and North America

== Synonyms ==
Synonyms for this species include:

- Anthidium tenuiflorae yukonense Cockerell, 1926
