= Anthidium tesselatum =

Scientific classification
- Kingdom: Animalia
- Phylum: Arthropoda
- Clade: Pancrustacea
- Class: Insecta
- Order: Hymenoptera
- Family: Megachilidae
- Genus: Anthidium
- Species: A. tesselatum

Binomial name
- Anthidium tesselatum Klug, 1832

Synonyms
- see text

Species of bee

Anthidium tesselatum is a species of bee in the family Megachilidae, the leaf-cutter, carder, or mason bees.

== Synonyms ==
Synonyms for this species include:

- Anthidium helvolum Klug, 1832
- Anthidium waltlii Spinola, 1838
- Anthidium villosulum Smith, 1854
- Anthidum signiferum Walker, 1871
- Anthidum tesselatum var aegyptiacum Friese, 1897
- Anthidium lanitarse Friese, 1917
- Anthidium lanitarse lloydi Mavromoustakis, 1936
- Anthidium lanitarse var zebra Benoist, 1950
