= Anthidium bischoffi =

Scientific classification
- Kingdom: Animalia
- Phylum: Arthropoda
- Clade: Pancrustacea
- Class: Insecta
- Order: Hymenoptera
- Family: Megachilidae
- Genus: Anthidium
- Species: A. bischoffi

Binomial name
- Anthidium bischoffi Mavromoustakis, 1954

Synonyms
- see text

Species of bee

Anthidium bischoffi is a species of bee in the family Megachilidae, the leaf-cutter, carder, or mason bees.

== Synonyms ==
Synonyms for this species include:

- Anthidium bischoffi dzhachramicum Popov, 1967
- Anthidium bischoffi var hoggaricum Mavromoustakis, 1954
