= Anthidium rubripes =

Scientific classification
- Kingdom: Animalia
- Phylum: Arthropoda
- Clade: Pancrustacea
- Class: Insecta
- Order: Hymenoptera
- Family: Megachilidae
- Genus: Anthidium
- Species: A. rubripes

Binomial name
- Anthidium rubripes Friese, 1908

Synonyms
- see text

Species of bee

Anthidium rubripes is a species of bee in the family Megachilidae, the leaf-cutter, carder, or mason bees.

== Distribution ==
- Argentina
- Bolivia
- Chile
- Peru

== Synonyms ==
Synonyms for this species include:

- Anthidium boliviense Friese, 1920
- Anthidium adriani Ruiz, 1935
- Anthidium kuscheli Moure, 1957
