= Anthidium taeniatum =

Scientific classification
- Kingdom: Animalia
- Phylum: Arthropoda
- Clade: Pancrustacea
- Class: Insecta
- Order: Hymenoptera
- Family: Megachilidae
- Genus: Anthidium
- Species: A. taeniatum

Binomial name
- Anthidium taeniatum Latreille, 1809

Synonyms
- See text

Species of bee

Anthidium taeniatum is a species of bee in the family Megachilidae, the leaf-cutter, carder, or mason bees.

== Synonyms ==
Synonyms for this species include:

- Anthidium fasciatum Latreille, 1809
- Anthidium sulphureum Lepeletier, 1841
- Anthidium affine Morawitz, 1873
- Anthidium affine var monile Friese, 1897
- Anthidium affine var nostrum Radoszkowski, 1893
- Anthidium frontevillosum Pasteels, 1969
