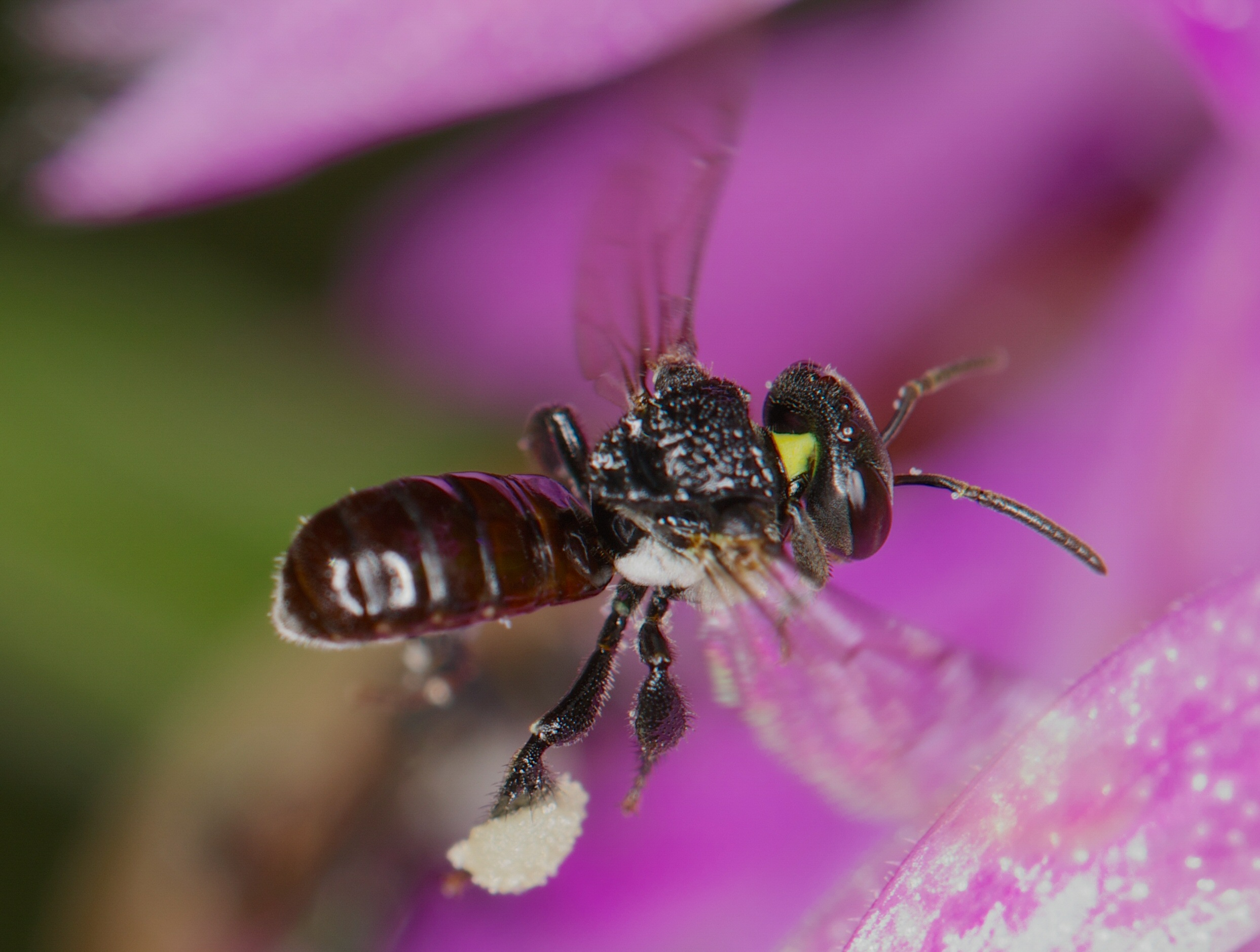
- The sugarbag bee, Tetragonula carbonaria

Scientific classification
- Kingdom: Animalia
- Phylum: Arthropoda
- Clade: Pancrustacea
- Class: Insecta
- Order: Hymenoptera
- Suborder: Apocrita
- Infraorder: Aculeata
- Superfamily: Apoidea
- Clade: Anthophila

Families
- Andrenidae; Apidae; Colletidae; Halictidae; Megachilidae; Melittidae; Stenotritidae

Synonyms
- Apiformes (from Latin 'apis')

= Bee =

Bees Temporal range: 70–0 Ma Late Cretaceous – Present

Clade of insects

Bees are winged insects that form a monophyletic clade Anthophila within the superfamily Apoidea of the order Hymenoptera, with over 20,000 known species in seven recognized families. Some species – including honey bees, bumblebees, and stingless bees – are social insects living in colonies, whereas over 90% of bee species – including mason bees, carpenter bees, leafcutter bees, and sweat bees – are solitary.

Unlike the closely related wasps and ants, who are carnivorous/omnivorous, bees are herbivores that specifically feed on nectar (nectarivory) and pollen (palynivory), the former primarily as a carbohydrate source for metabolic energy, and the latter primarily for protein and other nutrients for their larvae. They are found on every continent except Antarctica, and in every habitat on the planet that contains insect-pollinated flowering plants. The most common bees in the Northern Hemisphere are the Halictidae, or sweat bees, but they are small and often mistaken for wasps or flies. Bees range in size from tiny stingless bee species, whose workers are less than 2 millimeters (0.08 in) long, to the leafcutter bee Megachile pluto, the largest species of bee, whose females can attain a length of 39 millimeters (1.54 in). Vertebrate predators of bees include primates and birds such as bee-eaters; insect predators include beewolves and dragonflies.

Bees are best known for their ecological roles as pollinators and, in the case of the best-known species, the western honey bee, for producing honey, a regurgitated and dehydrated viscous mixture of partially digested monosaccharides kept as food storage of the bee colony. Pollination management via bees is important both ecologically and agriculturally, and the decline in wild bee populations has increased the demand and value of domesticated pollination by commercially managed hives of honey bees. Human beekeeping or apiculture (meliponiculture for stingless bees) has been practiced as a discipline of animal husbandry for millennia, since at least the times of Ancient Egypt and Ancient Greece. Bees have appeared in mythology and folklore, through all phases of art and literature from ancient times to the present day, although primarily focused in the Northern Hemisphere where beekeeping is far more common. In Mesoamerica, the Maya have practiced large-scale intensive meliponiculture since pre-Columbian times.

== Characteristics ==
Bees have the following characteristics:

- A pair of large compound eyes which cover much of the surface of the head. Between and above these are three small simple eyes (ocelli) which provide information on light intensity.
- The antennae usually have 13 segments in males and 12 in females, and are geniculate, having an elbow joint part way along. They house large numbers of sense organs that can detect touch (mechanoreceptors), smell and taste; and small, hairlike mechanoreceptors that can detect air movement so as to "hear" sounds.
- The mouthparts are adapted for both chewing and sucking by having both a pair of mandibles and a long proboscis for sucking up nectar.
- The thorax has three segments, each with a pair of robust legs, and a pair of membranous wings on the hind two segments. The front legs of corbiculate bees bear combs for cleaning the antennae. In many species the hind legs bear pollen baskets, flattened sections with incurving hairs to secure the collected pollen. The wings are synchronized in flight, and the somewhat smaller hind wings connect to the forewings by a row of hooks along their margin which connect to a groove in the forewing.
- The abdomen has nine segments, the hindermost three being modified into the sting.
- Many bees are brightly colored, displaying contrasting bands of yellow, orange, or red against black. These colors function as aposematic signals, warning potential predators that the insect may sting or otherwise defend itself, although similar warning patterns are also seen in many harmless insects that mimic bees or wasps, a form of Batesian mimicry.

The largest species of bee is thought to be Wallace's giant bee Megachile pluto, whose females can attain a length of 39 millimeters (1.54 in). The smallest species may be dwarf stingless bees in the tribe Meliponini whose workers are less than 2 millimeters (0.08 in) in length.

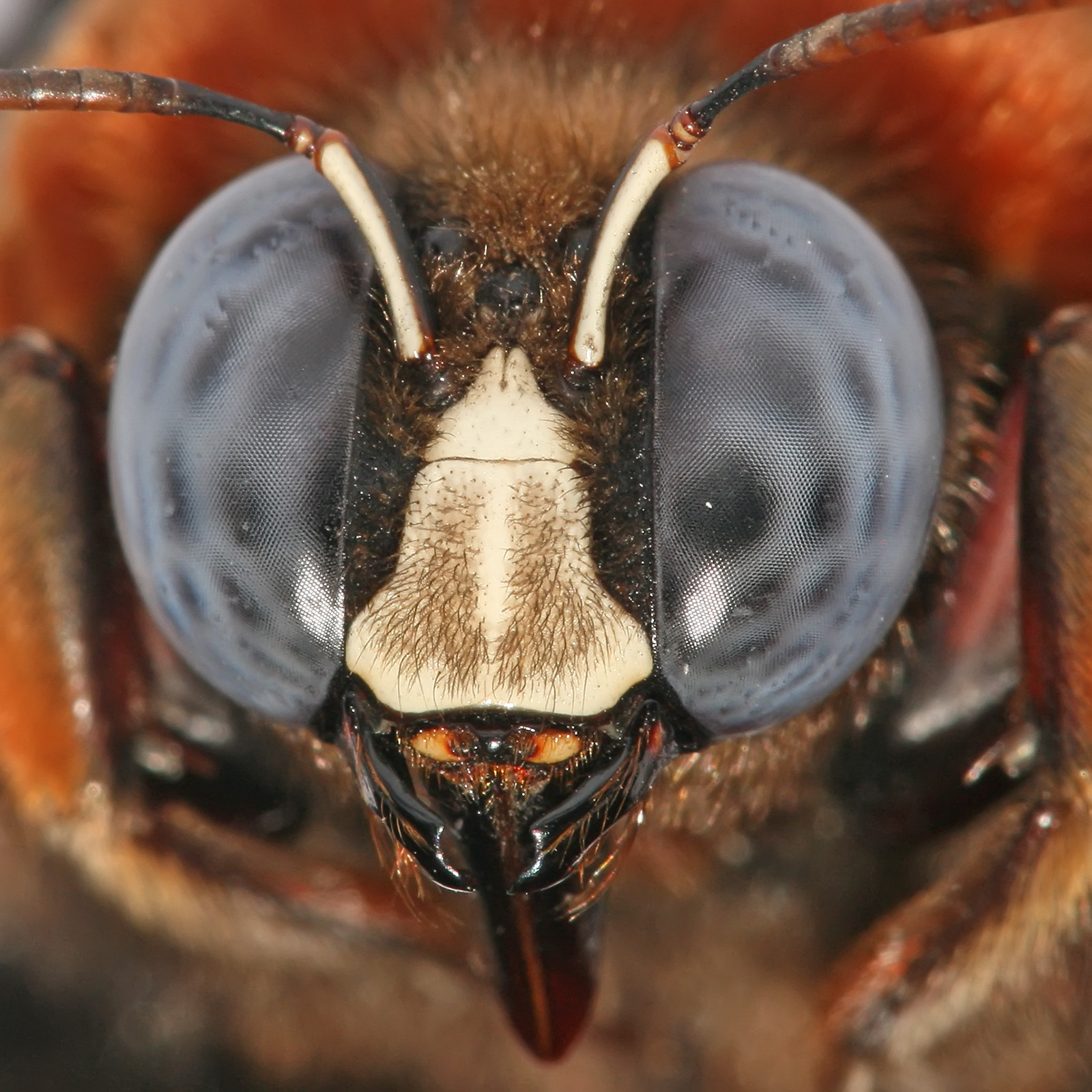
Head of a male carpenter bee, showing antennae, three ocelli, compound eyes, and mouthparts

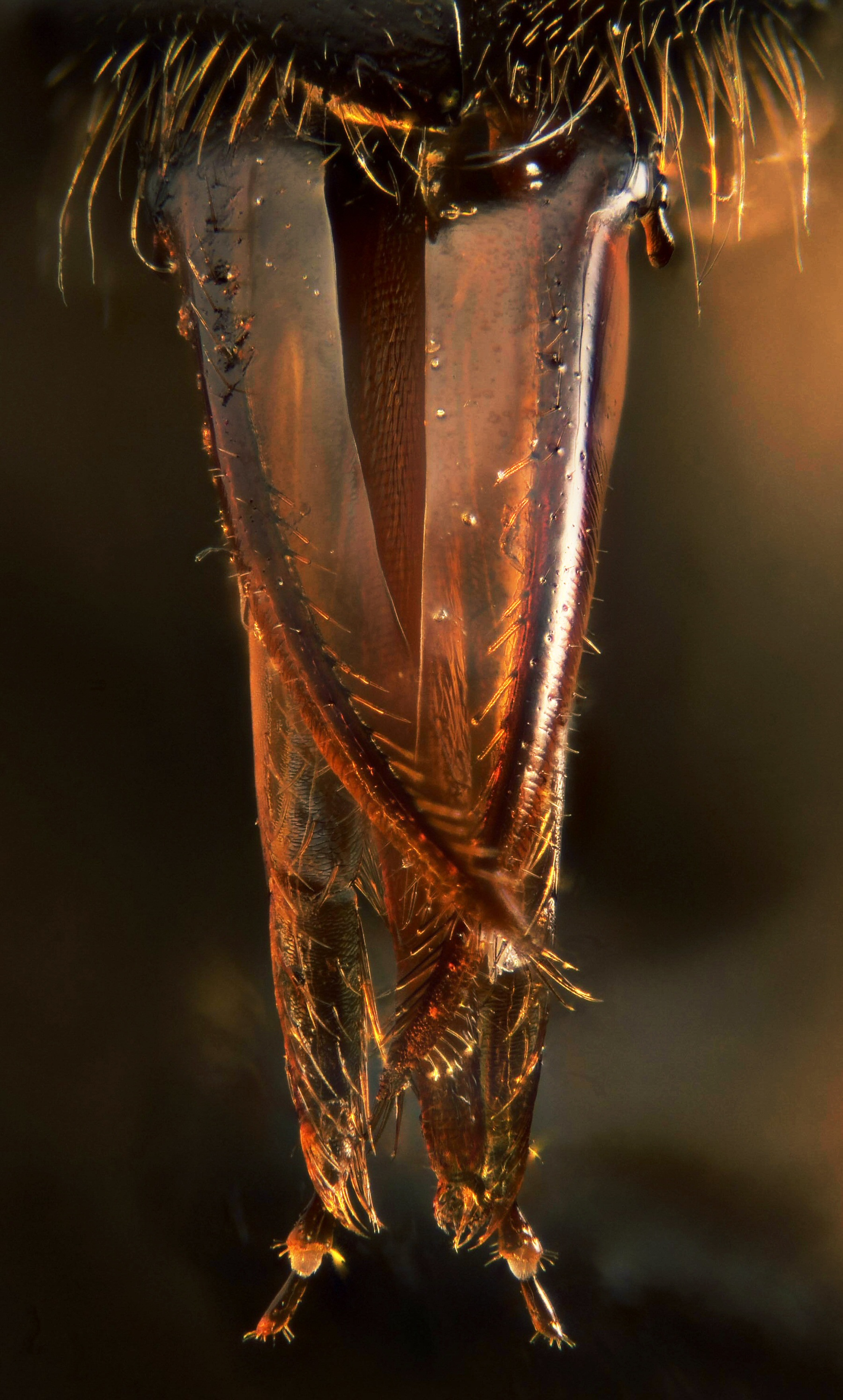
The lapping mouthparts of a honeybee, showing labium and maxillae

=== Differences from wasps ===
Bees differ from closely related groups such as wasps by having branched or plume-like setae (hairs), combs on the forelimbs for cleaning their antennae, small anatomical differences in limb structure, and the venation of the hind wings. In females, the seventh dorsal abdominal plate is also divided into two half-plates.

=== Most bees are not like honeybees ===
Honeybees are quite atypical of bees in general

Honeybees are widely domesticated but are quite atypical of bees in general. Of some 20,000 species of bee, only 7 are honeybees. Most bees, other than bumblebees, are much smaller than honeybees, often under 2 mm long; they are mostly solitary rather than social, they do not make large nests, honey, or wax, and they rarely sting humans. Instead, many species pollinate just one group of flowers and are adapted to the habitat where those flowers grow.

== Evolution ==
The immediate ancestors of bees were stinging wasps in the family Ammoplanidae, which were predators of other insects. The switch from insect prey to pollen may have resulted from the consumption of prey insects which were flower visitors and were partially covered with pollen when they were fed to the wasp larvae. This same evolutionary scenario may have occurred within the vespoid wasps, where the pollen wasps evolved from predatory ancestors.

Based on phylogenetic analysis, bees are thought to have originated during the Early Cretaceous (about 124 million years ago) on the supercontinent of West Gondwana, just prior to its breakup into South America and Africa. The supercontinent is thought to have been a largely xeric environment at this time; modern bee diversity hotspots are also in xeric and seasonal temperate environments, suggesting strong niche conservatism among bees ever since their origins.

Genomic analysis indicates that despite only appearing much later in the fossil record, all modern bee families had already diverged from one another by the end of the Cretaceous. The Melittidae, Apidae, and Megachilidae had already evolved on the supercontinent prior to its fragmentation. Further divergences were facilitated by West Gondwana's breakup around 100 million years ago, leading to a deep Africa-South America split within both the Apidae and Megachilidae, the isolation of the Melittidae in Africa, and the origins of the Colletidae, Andrenidae and Halictidae in South America. The rapid radiation of the South American bee families is thought to have followed the concurrent radiation of flowering plants within the same region. Later in the Cretaceous (80 million years ago), colletid bees colonized Australia from South America (with an offshoot lineage evolving into the Stenotritidae), and by the end of the Cretaceous, South American bees had also colonized North America. The North American fossil taxon Cretotrigona belongs to a group that is no longer found in North America, suggesting that many bee lineages went extinct during the Cretaceous–Paleogene extinction event (the "K-Pg extinction").

Following the K-Pg extinction, surviving bee lineages continued to spread into the Northern Hemisphere, colonizing Europe from Africa by the Paleocene, and then spreading east to Asia. This was facilitated by the warming climate around the same time, allowing bees to move to higher latitudes following the spread of tropical and subtropical habitats. By the Eocene (~45 mya) there was already considerable diversity among eusocial bee lineages. (Note: Triassic nests in a petrified forest in Arizona, implying that bees evolved much earlier, are now thought to be beetle borings.) A second extinction event among bees is thought to have occurred due to rapid climatic cooling around the Eocene-Oligocene boundary, leading to the extinction of some bee lineages such as the tribe Melikertini. During the Paleogene and Neogene periods, bee lineages expanded worldwide. This came about as continental drift and changing climates created new barriers and habitats, isolating populations and driving the evolution of many new tribes.

=== Fossils ===
The oldest non-compression bee fossil is Cretotrigona prisca, a corbiculate bee of Late Cretaceous age (~70 mya) found in New Jersey amber. A fossil from the early Cretaceous (~100 mya), Melittosphex burmensis, was initially considered "an extinct lineage of pollen-collecting Apoidea sister to the modern bees", but subsequent research has rejected the claim that Melittosphex is a bee, or even a member of the superfamily Apoidea to which bees belong, instead treating the lineage as incertae sedis within the Aculeata.

The Allodapini (within the Apidae) appeared around 53 Mya. The Colletidae appear as fossils only from the late Oligocene (~25 Mya) to early Miocene. The Melittidae are known from Palaeomacropis eocenicus in the Early Eocene. The Megachilidae are known from trace fossils (characteristic leaf cuttings) from the Middle Eocene. The Andrenidae are known from the Eocene-Oligocene boundary, around 34 Mya, of the Florissant shale. The Halictidae first appear in the Early Eocene with species found in amber. The Stenotritidae are known from fossil brood cells of Pleistocene age.

=== Coevolution ===
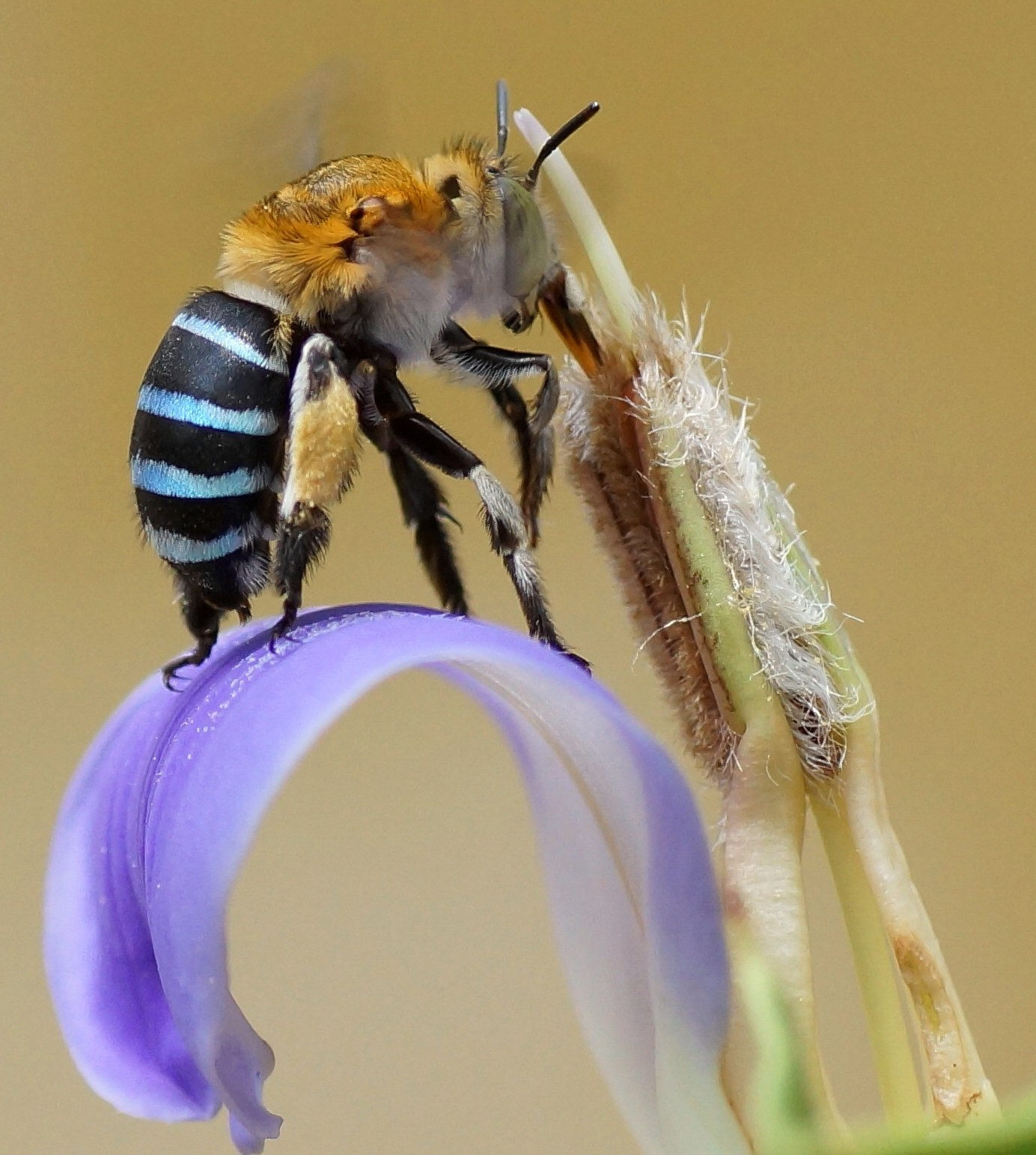
Long-tongued bees and long-tubed flowers coevolved, like this Amegilla species (Apidae) on Acanthus ilicifolius.

The earliest animal-pollinated flowers were shallow, cup-shaped blooms pollinated by insects such as beetles, so the syndrome of insect pollination was well established before bees evolved. Bees represent a further step in this process, being specialized for pollination through behavioral and physical traits that specifically enhance the task and make them the most efficient pollinating insects. In a process of coevolution, flowers developed floral rewards such as nectar and longer tubes, and bees developed longer tongues to extract the nectar. Bees also developed structures known as scopal hairs and pollen baskets to collect and carry pollen. The location and type differ among and between groups of bees. Most species have scopal hairs on their hind legs or on the underside of their abdomens. Some species in the family Apidae have pollen baskets on their hind legs, while very few lack these and instead collect pollen in their crops. The appearance of these structures drove the adaptive radiation of the angiosperms, and, in turn, bees themselves. Bees and certain mites have indeed coevolved, with some bee species evolving specialized structures called acarinaria that serve as lodgings for mites, demonstrating a mutualistic relationship. Mites residing in these acarinaria can benefit their bee hosts by eating fungi that attack pollen and brood, leading to reduced fungal contamination and improved bee survivorship.

=== Phylogeny ===
==== External ====
Molecular phylogeny was used by Debevic et al, 2012, to demonstrate that the bees (Anthophila) arose from deep within the Crabronidae sensu lato, which was thus rendered paraphyletic. In their study, the placement of the monogeneric Heterogynaidae was uncertain. The small family Mellinidae was not included in this analysis.

Further studies by Sann et al., 2018, elevated the subfamilies (plus one tribe and one subtribe) of Crabronidae sensu lato to family status. They also recovered the placement of Heterogyna within Nyssonini and sunk Heterogynaidae. The newly erected family, Ammoplanidae, formerly a subtribe of Pemphredoninae, was recovered as the most sister family to bees.

- Apoidea
  - Ampulicidae (Cockroach wasps)
  - - Astatidae
    - - - Bembicidae
        - - Sphecidae (sensu stricto)
          - - - Crabronidae (sensu stricto)
              - Mellinidae
      - - - Pemphredonidae
          - Philanthidae
        - - Psenidae
          - - - Ammoplanidae
              - Anthophila (bees)

==== Internal ====
This cladogram of the bee families is based on Hedtke et al., 2013, which places the former families Dasypodaidae and Meganomiidae as subfamilies inside the Melittidae.

- Anthophila (bees)
  - - Melittidae (inc. Dasypodainae, Meganomiinae) at least 50 Mya
    - - long-tongued bees
        - Apidae (inc. honeybees, cuckoo bees, carpenter bees) ≈87 Mya
        - Megachilidae (mason, leafcutter bees) ≈50 Mya
      - short-tongued bees
        - Andrenidae (mining bees) ≈34 Mya
        - - Halictidae (sweat bees) ≈50 Mya
          - - Colletidae (plasterer bees) ≈25 Mya
            - Stenotritidae (large Australian bees) ≈2 Mya

== Sociality ==
=== Haplodiploid breeding system ===
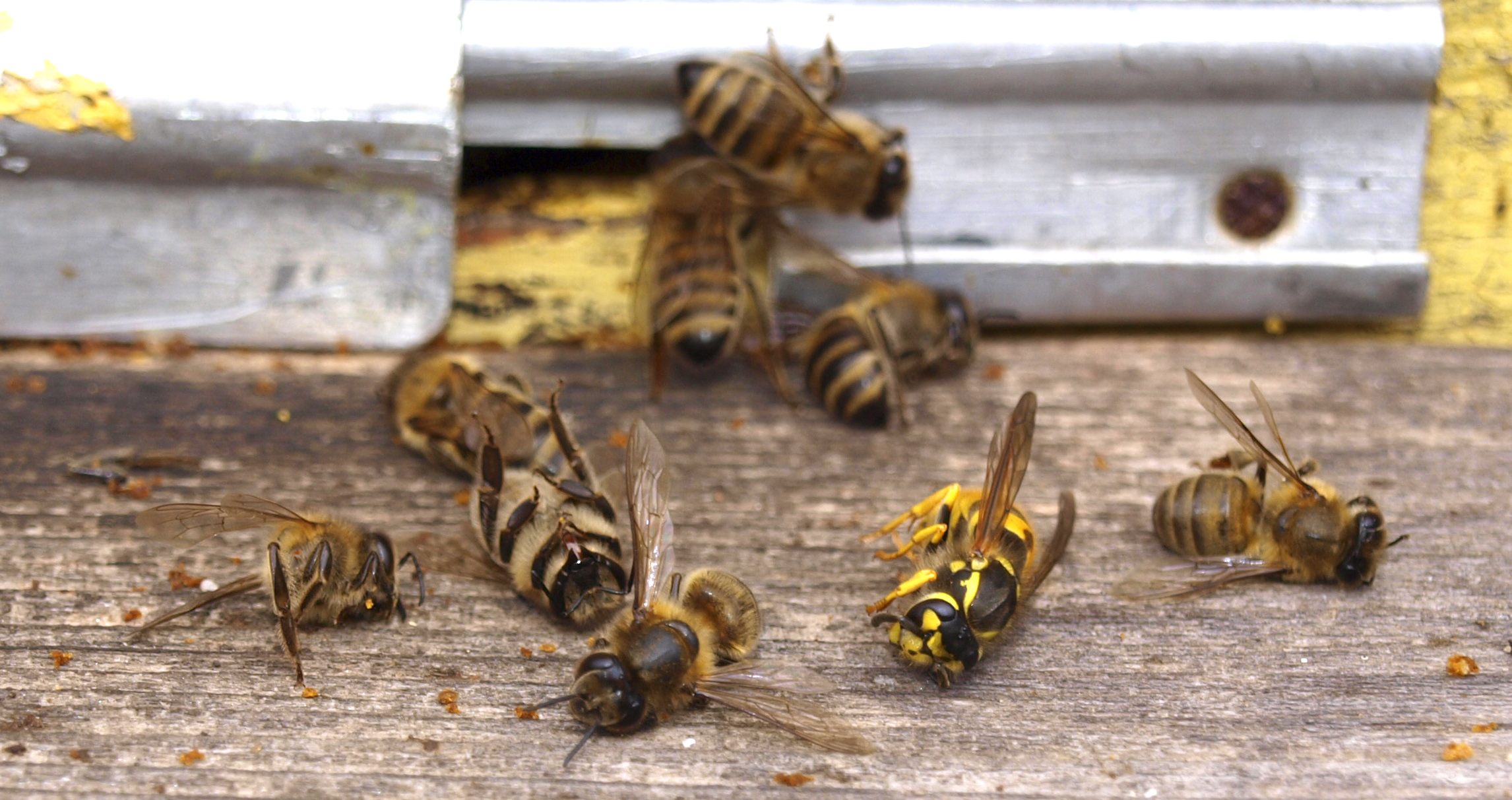
Willing to die for their sisters: worker honey bees killed defending their hive against wasps, along with a dead wasp. Such altruistic behaviour may be favoured by the haplodiploid sex determination system of bees.

According to inclusive fitness theory, an organism can increase its evolutionary success not only by increasing its own offspring, but also by helping close relatives reproduce. In genetic terms, cooperation is favored when the cost to the helper is less than the product of relatedness and benefit. This condition is more easily met in haplodiploid species such as bees, where the genetic relationships create strong incentives for cooperative behavior.

Haplodiploidy alone does not explain the evolution of eusociality. Some eusocial species such as termites are not haplodiploid. Conversely, many haplodiploid species, including most bees, are not eusocial, and even among eusocial bees, queens often mate with several males, producing half sisters that share only about a quarter of their genes. However, since single mating appears to be the ancestral condition in all eusocial lineages studied so far, haplodiploidy may still have played an important role in the early evolution of eusocial behaviour in bees.

=== Eusociality ===
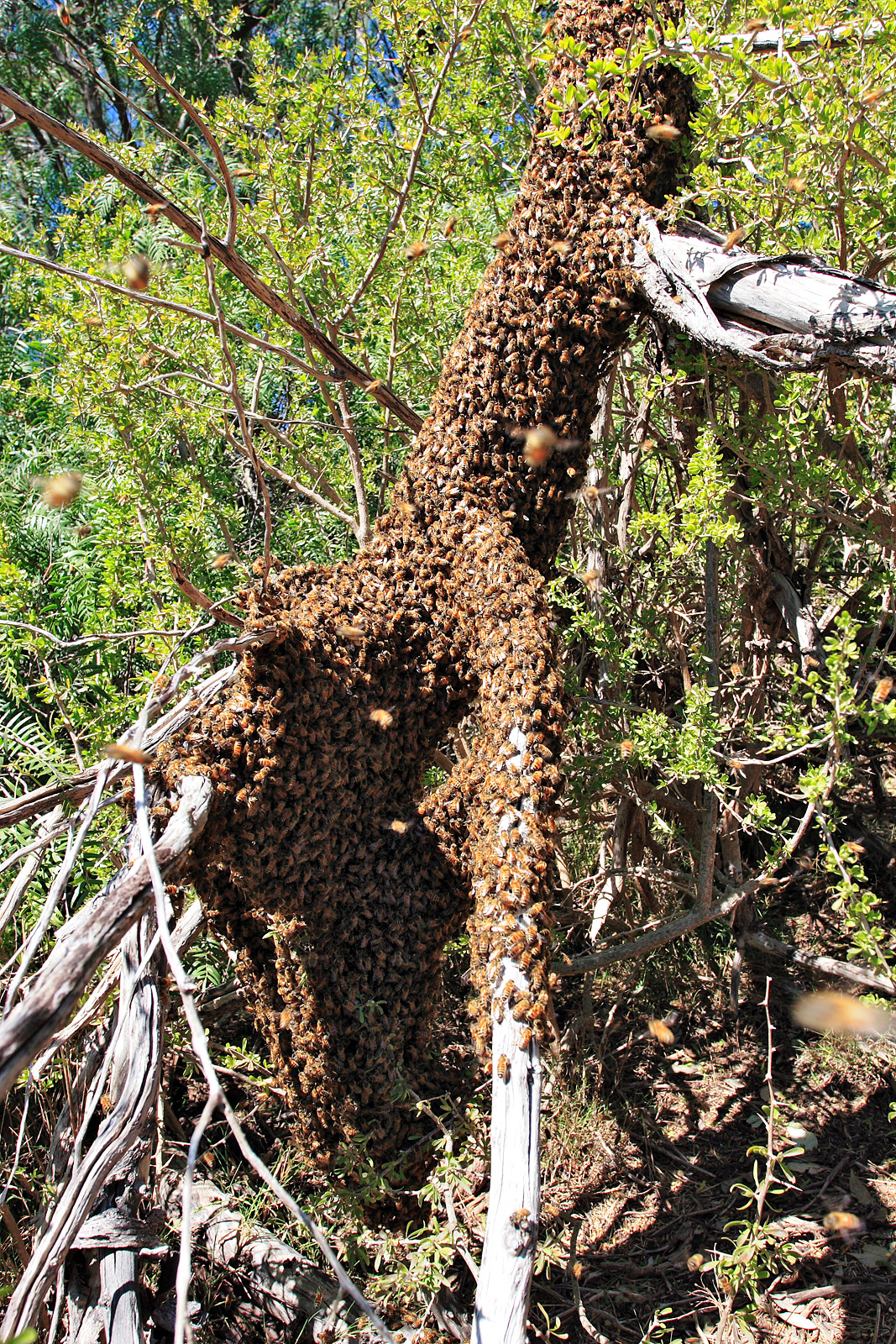
A Western honey bee swarm

Bees may be solitary or may live in various types of community. Eusociality appears to have arisen independently at least three times in halictid bees. The most advanced of these form eusocial colonies; these are characterized by cooperative brood care and a division of labour into reproductive and non-reproductive adults, with overlapping generations. This division of labour creates specialized groups within eusocial societies, called castes. In some species, groups of cohabiting females are sisters. If these sisters share a division of labour, the group is described as semisocial. When the group instead includes a mother (the queen) and her daughters (the workers), it is considered eusocial. If the castes differ only in behavior and size, as in many paper wasps, the system is primitively eusocial. When the castes show clear morphological differences, the system is described as highly eusocial.

True honey bees (genus Apis, with eight species) are highly eusocial, and are among the best known insects. Their colonies are established by swarms, consisting of a queen and several thousand workers. There are 29 subspecies of one of these species, Apis mellifera, native to Europe, the Middle East, and Africa. Africanized bees are a hybrid strain of A. mellifera that escaped from experiments involving crossing European and African subspecies; they are extremely defensive.

Stingless bees are also highly eusocial. They practice mass provisioning, with complex nest architecture and perennial colonies also established via swarming.

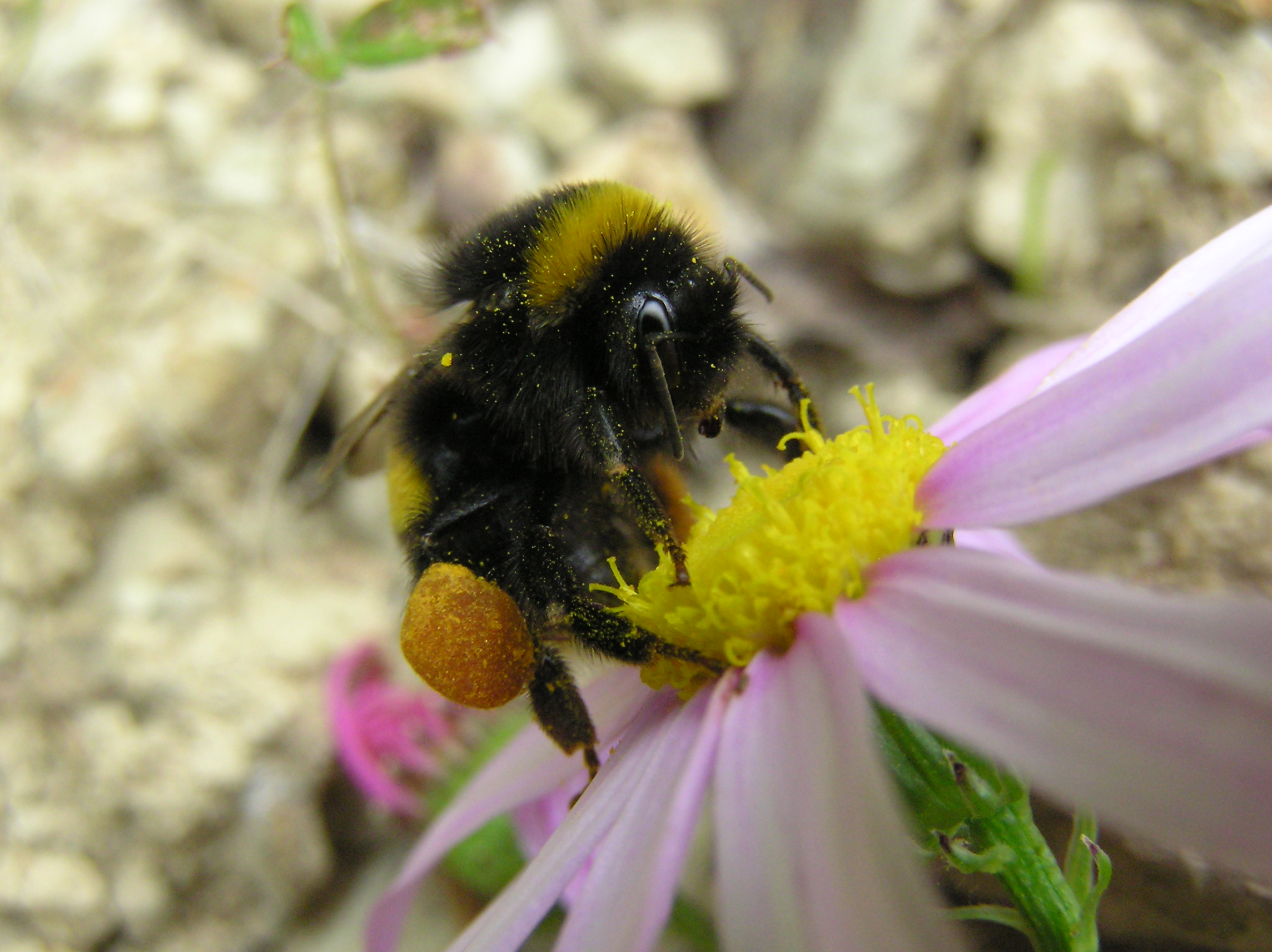
A bumblebee carrying pollen in its pollen baskets (corbiculae)

Many bumblebees are eusocial, similar to the eusocial Vespidae such as hornets in that the queen initiates a nest on her own rather than by swarming. Bumblebee colonies typically have from 50 to 200 bees at peak population, which occurs in mid to late summer. Nest architecture is simple, limited by the size of the pre-existing nest cavity, and colonies rarely last more than a year. In 2011, the International Union for Conservation of Nature set up the Bumblebee Specialist Group to review the threat status of all bumblebee species worldwide using the IUCN Red List criteria.

There are many more species of primitively eusocial than highly eusocial bees, but they have been studied less often. Most are in the family Halictidae, or "sweat bees". Colonies are typically small, with a dozen or fewer workers, on average. Queens and workers differ only in size, if at all. Most species have a single season colony cycle, even in the tropics, and only mated females hibernate. A few species, such as Halictus hesperus, have long active seasons and attain colony sizes in the hundreds. Some species are eusocial in parts of their range and solitary in others, or have a mix of eusocial and solitary nests in the same population. The orchid bees (Apidae) include some primitively eusocial species with similar biology. Some allodapine bees (Apidae) form primitively eusocial colonies, with progressive provisioning: a larva's food is supplied gradually as it develops, as is the case in honey bees and some bumblebees.

=== Solitary and communal bees ===
Most other bees, including familiar insects such as carpenter bees, leafcutter bees and mason bees are solitary in the sense that every female is fertile, and typically inhabits a nest she constructs herself. There is no division of labor, so these nests lack queens and worker bees. Solitary bees typically produce neither honey nor beeswax. Most bees collect pollen to feed their young, and have the necessary adaptations to do this, but a few species scavenge from carcasses to feed their offspring. Solitary bees are important pollinators; they gather pollen to provision their nests with food for their brood. Often it is mixed with nectar to form a paste-like consistency. Some solitary bees have advanced types of pollen-carrying structures on their bodies. Very few species of solitary bee are being cultured for commercial pollination. Most of these species belong to a distinct set of genera which are commonly known by their nesting behavior or preferences, namely the carpenter bees, sweat bees, mason bees, plasterer bees, squash bees, dwarf carpenter bees, leafcutter bees, alkali bees and digger bees.

Most solitary bees are fossorial, digging nests in the ground in a variety of soil textures and conditions, while others create nests in hollow reeds or twigs, or holes in wood. The female typically creates a compartment (a "cell") with an egg and some provisions for the resulting larva, then seals it off. A nest may consist of numerous cells. When the nest is in wood, usually the last (those closer to the entrance) contain eggs that will become males. The adult does not provide care for the brood once the egg is laid, and usually dies after making one or more nests. The males typically emerge first and are ready for mating when the females emerge. Solitary bees are very unlikely to sting (only in self-defense, if ever), and some (esp. in the family Andrenidae) are stingless.

While solitary, females each make individual nests. Some species, such as the European mason bee Hoplitis anthocopoides, and the Dawson's Burrowing bee, Amegilla dawsoni, are gregarious, preferring to make nests near others of the same species, and giving the appearance of being social. Large groups of solitary bee nests are called aggregations, to distinguish them from colonies. In some species, multiple females share a common nest, but each makes and provisions her own cells independently. This type of group is called "communal" and is not uncommon. The primary advantage appears to be that a nest entrance is easier to defend from predators and parasites when multiple females use that same entrance regularly.

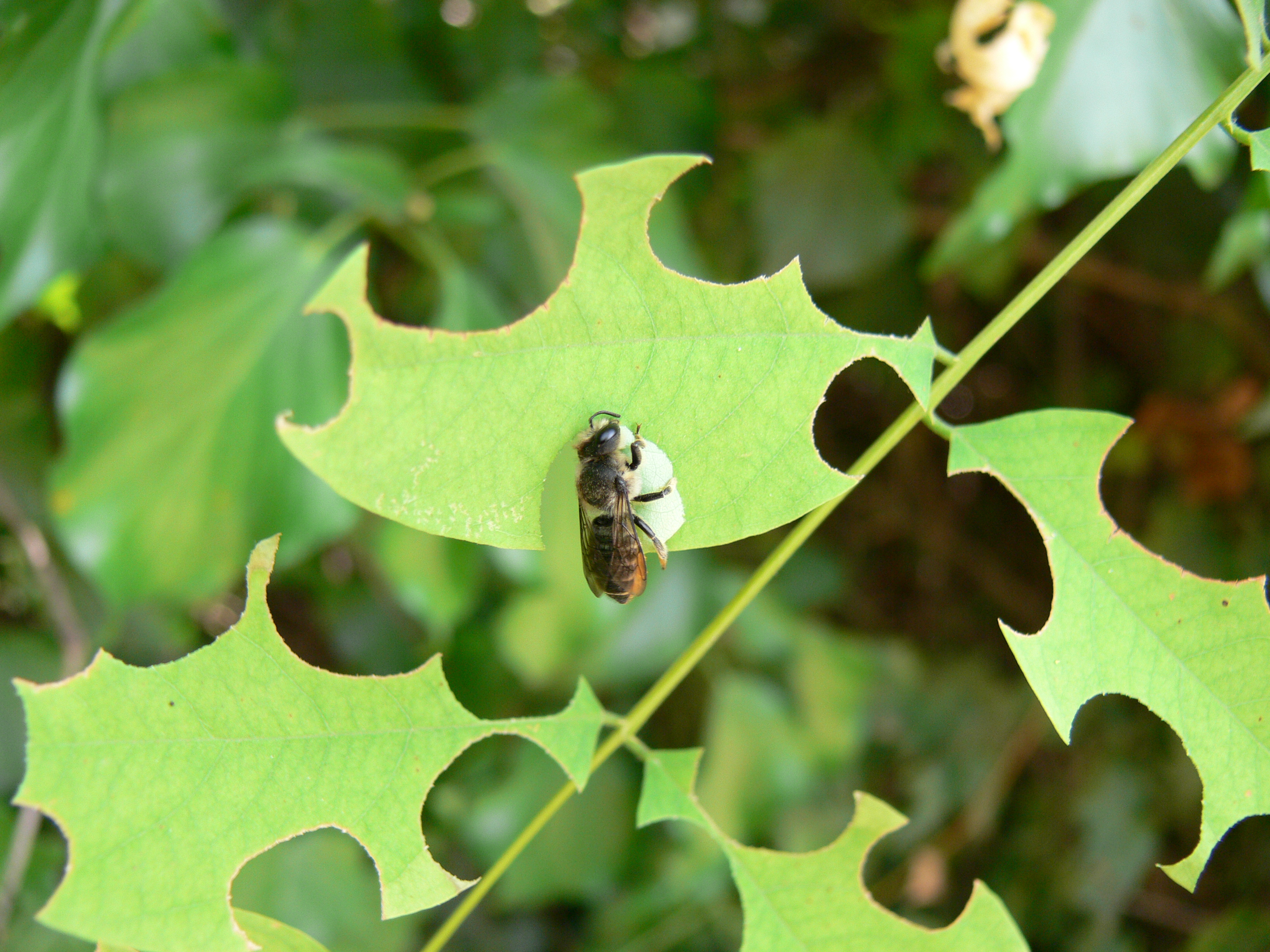
A leafcutting bee, Megachile rotundata, cutting circles from acacia leaves

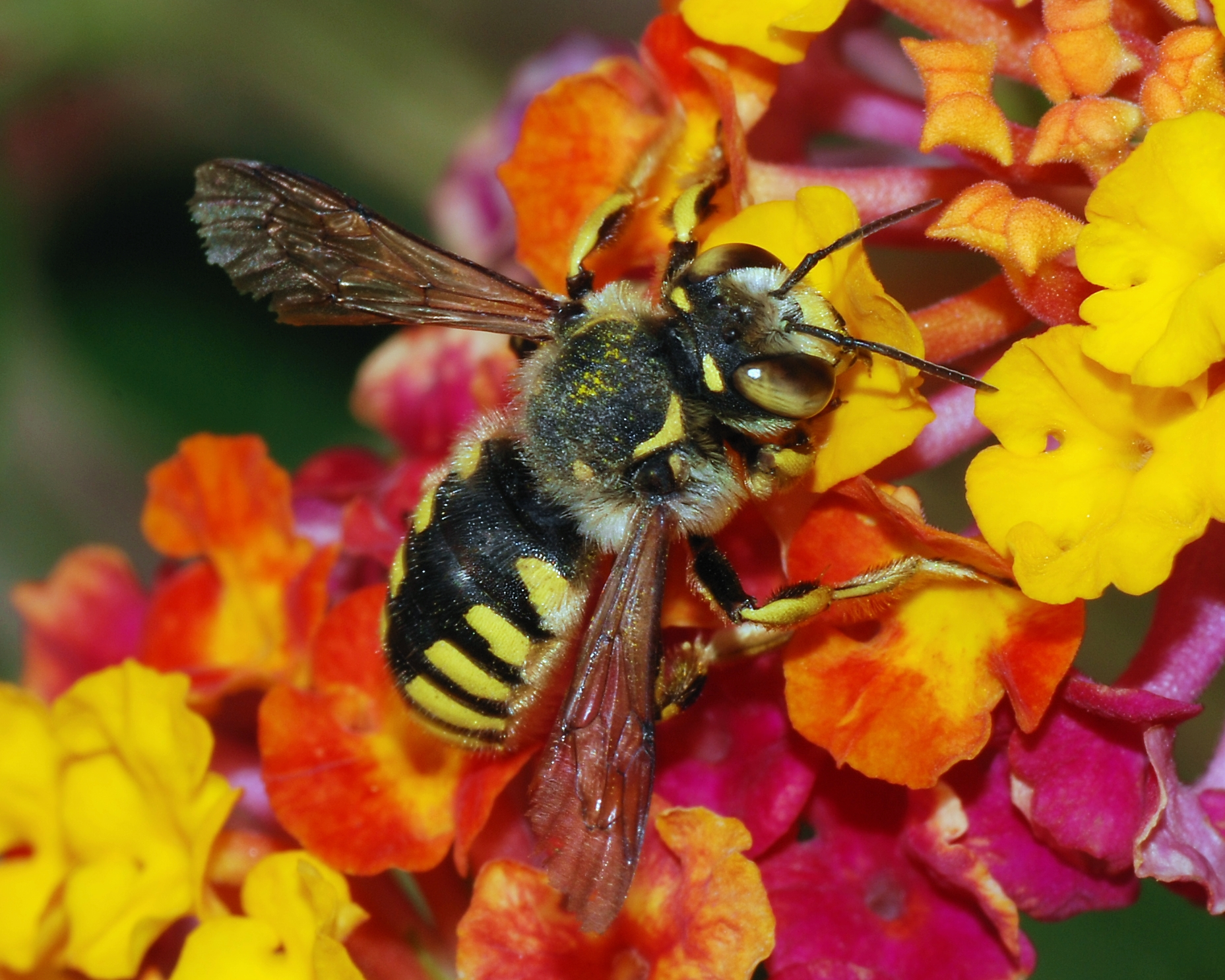
A solitary bee, Anthidium florentinum (family Megachilidae), visiting Lantana

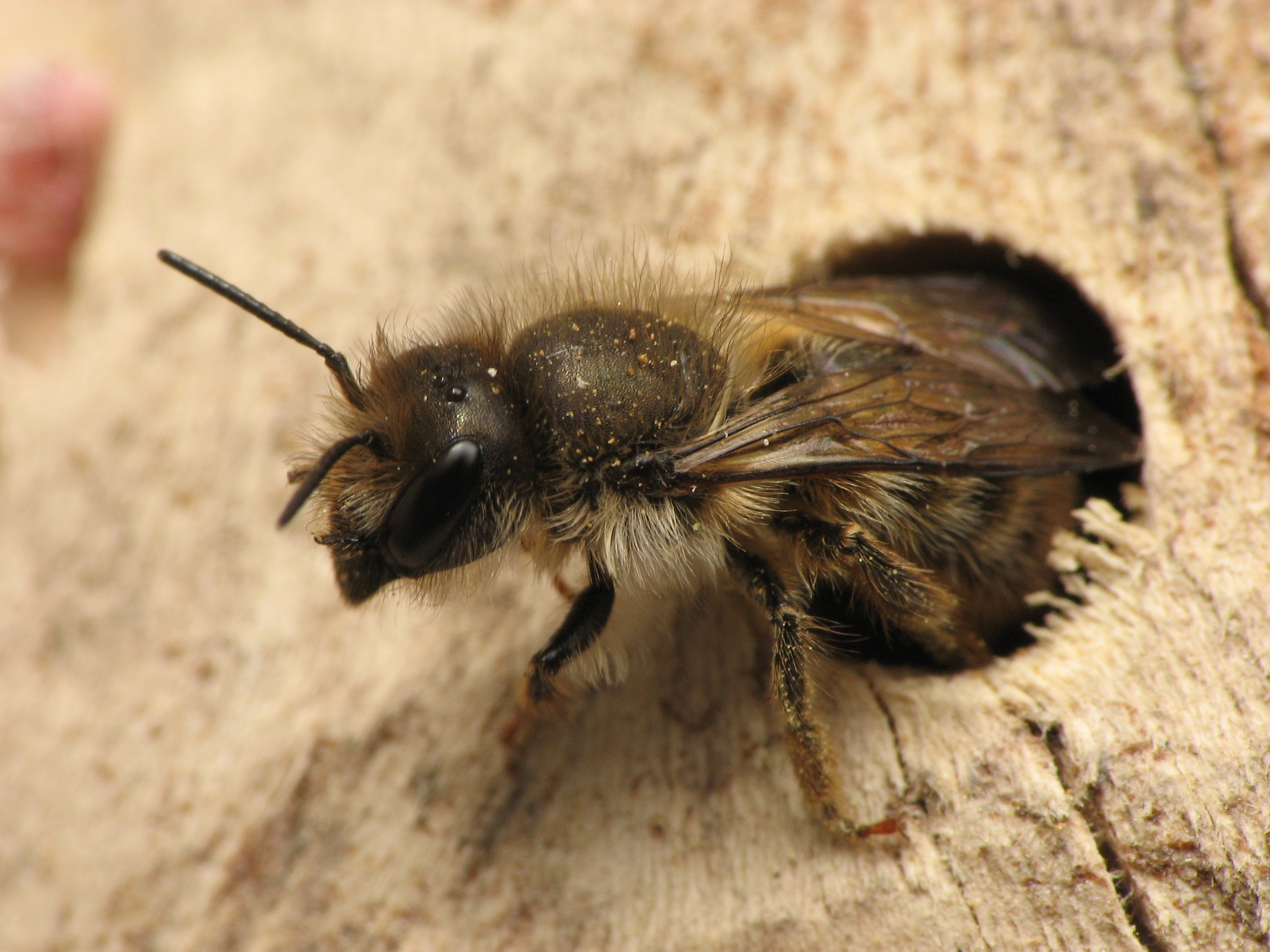
The mason bee Osmia cornifrons nests in a hole in dead wood. Bee "hotels" are often sold for this purpose.

== Biology ==
=== Life cycle ===
The life cycle of both solitary and social bees involves the laying of an egg, the development through several moults of a legless larva, a pupa in which the insect undergoes complete metamorphosis, and the emergence of a winged adult. Most solitary bees and bumble bees in temperate climates overwinter as adults or pupae and emerge in spring when increasing numbers of flowering plants come into bloom. The males usually emerge first and search for females with which to mate. Like the other members of Hymenoptera, bees are haplodiploid; the sex of a bee is determined by whether or not the egg is fertilized. After mating, a female stores the sperm, and determines which sex is required at the time each individual egg is laid, fertilized eggs producing female offspring and unfertilized eggs, males. Tropical bees may have several generations in a year and no resting diapause stage.

The egg is generally oblong, slightly curved and tapering at one end. Solitary bees, lay each egg in a separate cell with a supply of mixed pollen and nectar next to it. This may be rolled into a pellet or placed in a pile and is known as mass provisioning. Social bee species provision progressively, that is, they feed the larva regularly while it grows. The nest varies from a hole in the ground or in wood, in solitary bees, to a substantial structure with wax combs in bumblebees and honey bees.

In most species, bee larvae are whitish grubs, roughly oval and bluntly-pointed at both ends. They have 15 segments and spiracles in each segment for breathing. They have no legs but move within the cell, helped by tubercles on their sides. They have short horns on the head, jaws for chewing food and an appendage on either side of the mouth tipped with a bristle. There is a gland under the mouth that secretes a viscous liquid which solidifies into the silk they use to produce a cocoon. The cocoon is semi-transparent and the pupa can be seen through it. Over the course of a few days, the larva undergoes metamorphosis into a winged adult. When ready to emerge, the adult splits its skin dorsally and climbs out of the exuviae and breaks out of the cell.

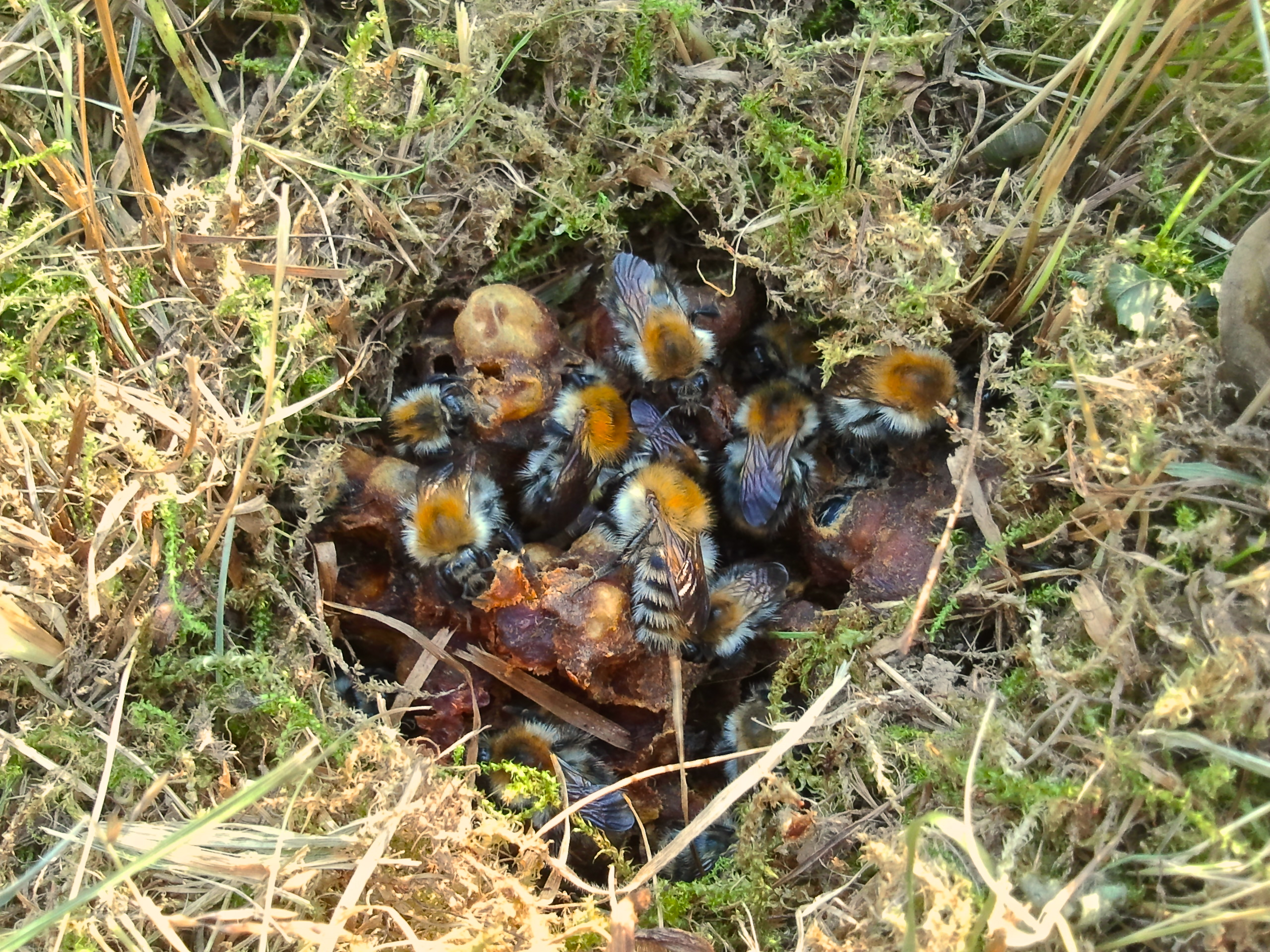
Nest of common carder bumblebee, wax canopy removed to show winged workers and pupae in irregularly placed wax cells

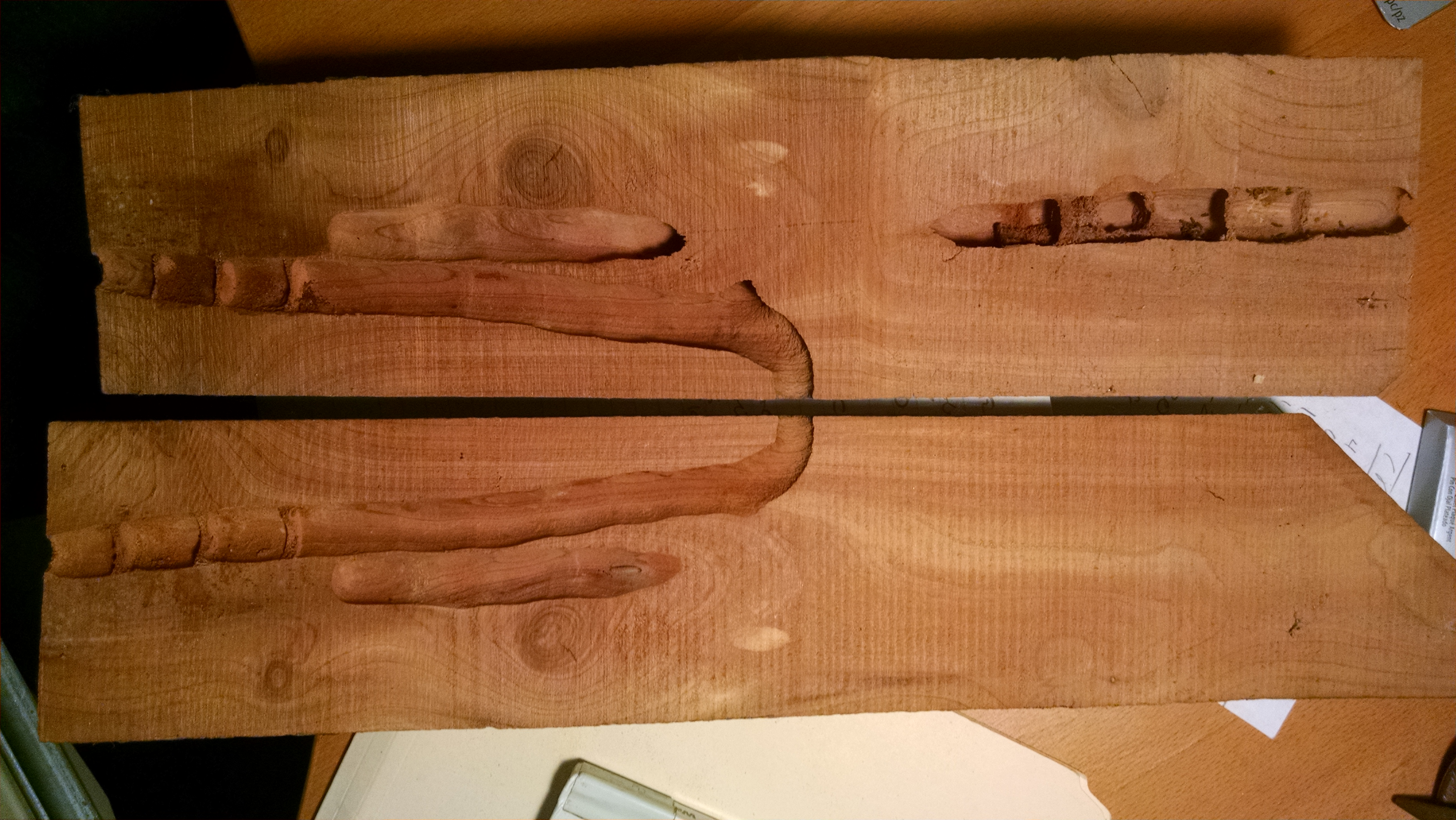
Carpenter bee nests in a cedar wood beam (sawn open)

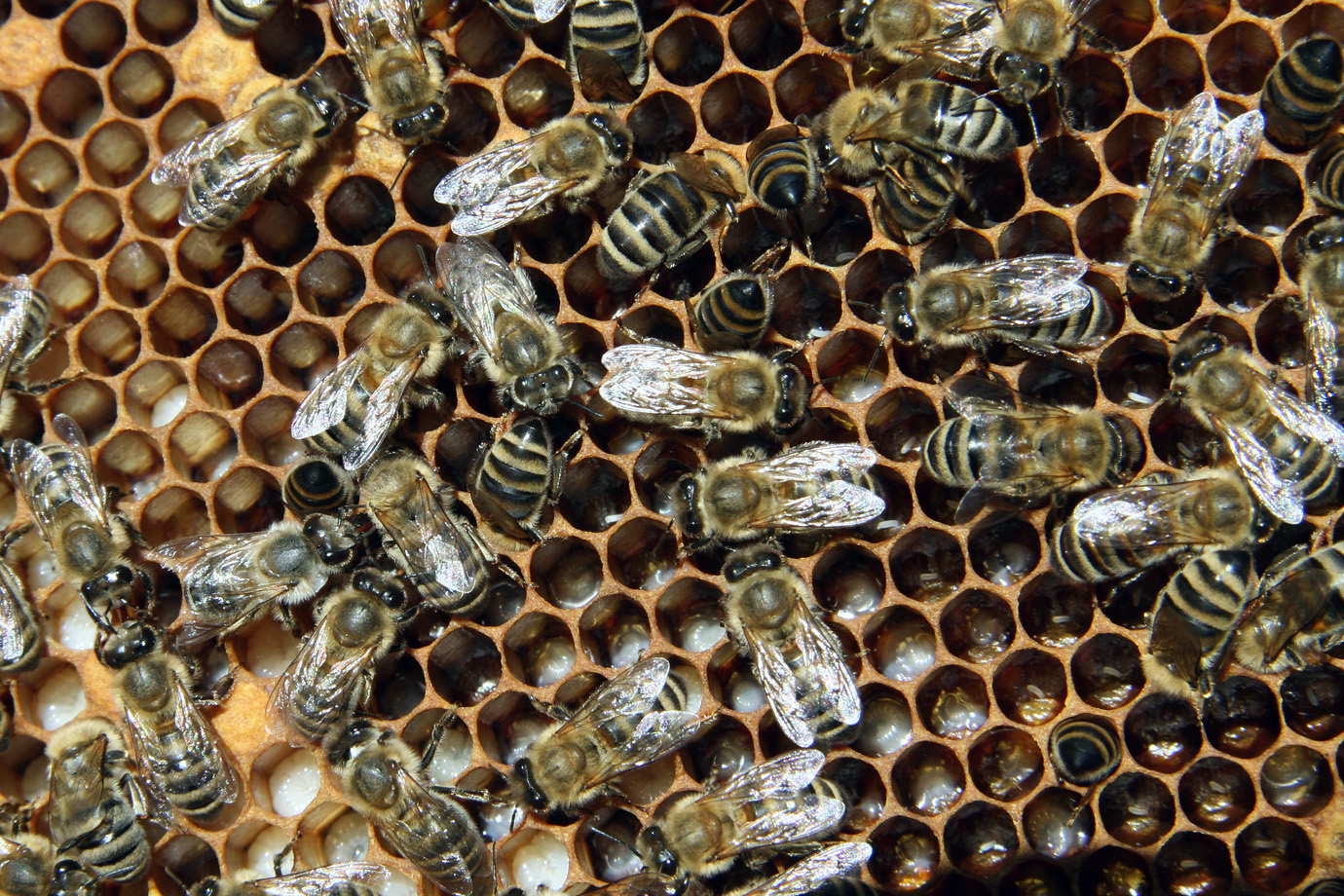
Honeybees on brood comb with eggs and larvae in cells

=== Flight ===
In the 1930s, calculations based on the aerodynamics of fixed wings appeared to show that insect flight was impossible, with results taken from equations meant for aircraft to wings that beat rapidly through short arcs. The author of the study remarked that "one should not be surprised that the results of the calculations do not square with reality," but this comment was later taken out of context and gave rise to the myth that "the bumblebee should not be able to fly."

In fact, those early models were never suited to describe how insects fly. Studies later showed that bees and many other insects produce lift through swirling vortices that form along the leading edge of the wing. High-speed imaging and robotic wing experiments confirmed that lift in bees results from rapid wing reversals and high wing-beat frequency, which together sustain the airflow needed to stay in the air.

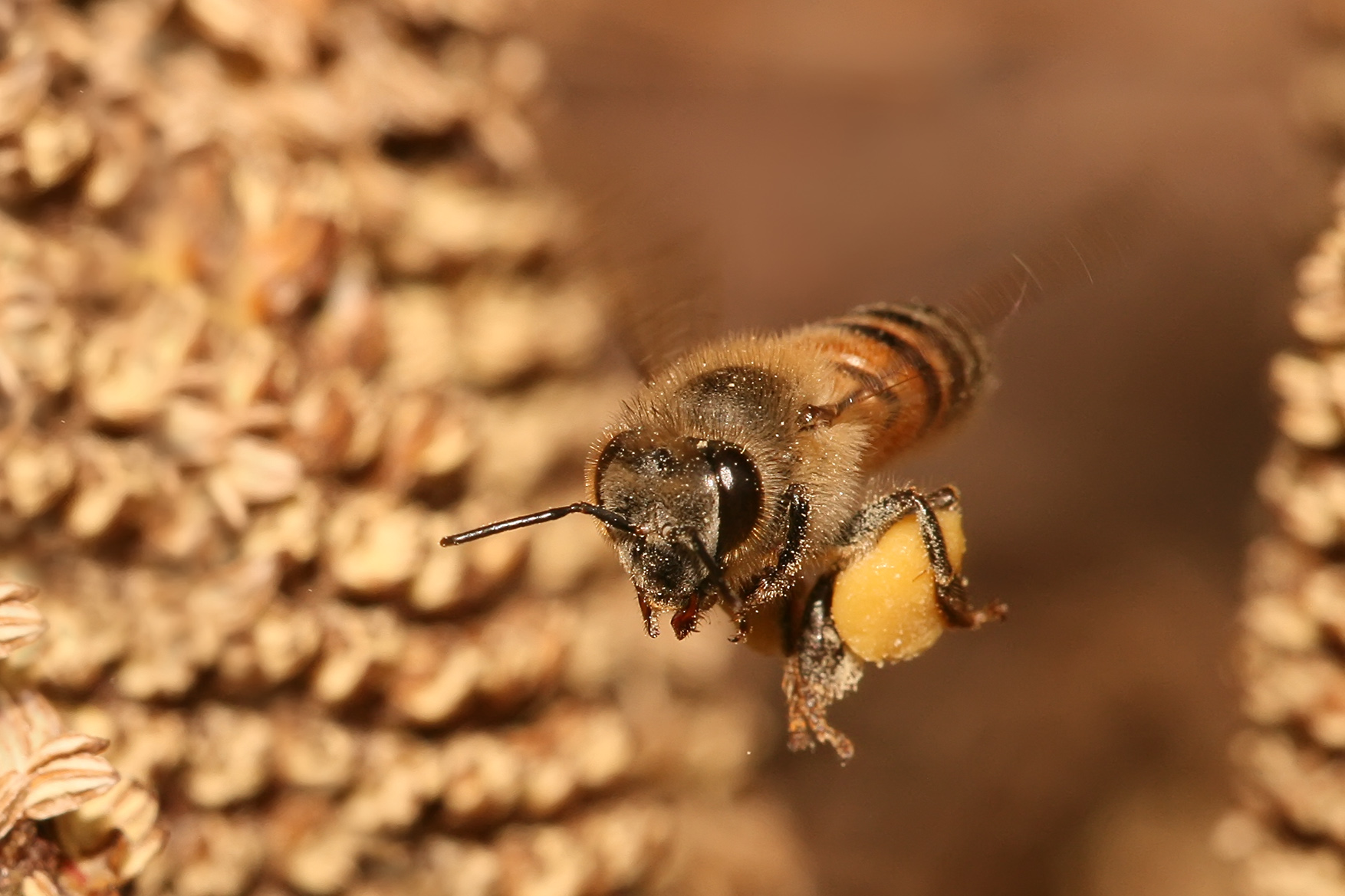
Honeybee in flight carrying pollen in pollen basket

Honey bee on Geranium (cultivar Rozanne) and flying. Second portion taken at 12,000 frames per second with 60 frames shown per second.

=== Navigation, communication, and finding food ===
Karl von Frisch (1953) discovered that honey bee workers can navigate, indicating the range and direction to food to other workers with a waggle dance.

The ethologist Karl von Frisch showed that honey bees communicate by the waggle dance, a pattern of movement that informs other workers about the direction and distance to food. He showed that honey bees use the sun as their main compass but can still locate its position on cloudy days by reading the polarization pattern of skylight. They use spatial memory with a "rich, map-like organization".

=== Digestion ===
The gut of bees is relatively simple, but multiple metabolic strategies exist in the gut microbiota. Pollinating bees consume nectar and pollen, which require different digestion strategies by somewhat specialized bacteria. While nectar is a liquid of mostly monosaccharide sugars and so easily absorbed, pollen contains complex polysaccharides: branching pectin and hemicellulose. Approximately five groups of bacteria are involved in digestion. Three groups specialize in simple sugars (Snodgrassella and two groups of Lactobacillus), and two other groups in complex sugars (Gilliamella and Bifidobacterium). Digestion of pectin and hemicellulose is dominated by bacterial clades Gilliamella and Bifidobacterium respectively. Bacteria that cannot digest polysaccharides obtain enzymes from their neighbors, and bacteria that lack certain amino acids do the same, creating multiple ecological niches.

Although most bee species eat nectar and pollen, some do not. The vulture bees in the genus Trigona, consume carrion and the immature stages of wasps, turning meat into a honey-like substance. Bees drink guttation drops from leaves for energy and nutrients.

== Ecology ==
=== Floral relationships ===
Most bees are generalists, collecting pollen from a range of flowering plants. Some are specialists, gathering pollen only from one or a few species or genera of closely related plants. Some genera in Melittidae and Apidae are highly specialized for collecting plant oils as well as or instead of nectar; they mix the oils with pollen to feed their larvae. Male orchid bees in some species gather aromatic compounds from orchids, which is one of the few cases where male bees are effective pollinators. All bees are able to detect desirable flowers by recognizing ultraviolet patterning on flowers, and by floral odors. Bumblebees can in addition detect flowers' electromagnetic fields. Once landed, a bee uses nectar quality and pollen taste to determine whether to continue visiting similar flowers.

In rare cases, a plant species may only be effectively pollinated by a single bee species; some plants are endangered in part because their pollinator is threatened. Such specialist bees are however strongly associated with common, widespread plants visited by multiple pollinator species. For example, in the arid southwestern United States, the creosote bush (Larrea tridentata) supports more than forty bee species that specialize in collecting its pollen.

=== As mimics and models ===
Many bees are aposematically colored, typically orange and black, warning of their ability to defend themselves with a powerful sting. As such they are models for Batesian mimicry by non-stinging insects such as bee-flies, robber flies and hoverflies, all of which gain a measure of protection by superficially looking and behaving like bees.

Bees are themselves Müllerian mimics of other aposematic insects with the same color scheme, including wasps, lycid and other beetles, and many butterflies and moths (Lepidoptera) which are themselves distasteful, often through acquiring bitter and poisonous chemicals from their plant food. All the Müllerian mimics, including bees, benefit from the reduced risk of predation that results from their easily recognized warning coloration.

Bees are mimicked by plants such as the bee orchid which imitates both the appearance and the scent of a female bee; male bees attempt to mate (pseudocopulation) with the furry lip of the flower, thus pollinating it.

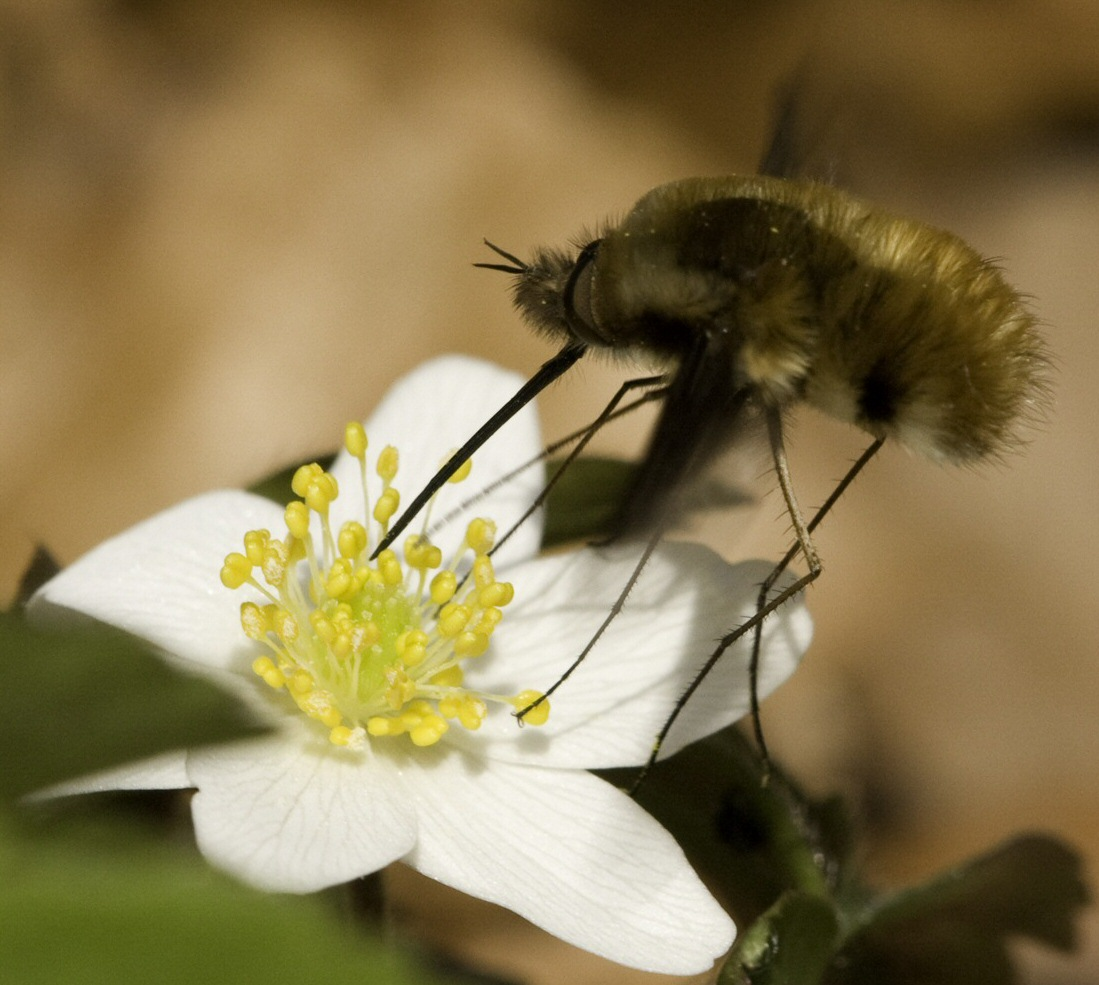
The bee-fly Bombylius major, a Batesian mimic of bees, taking nectar and pollinating a flower

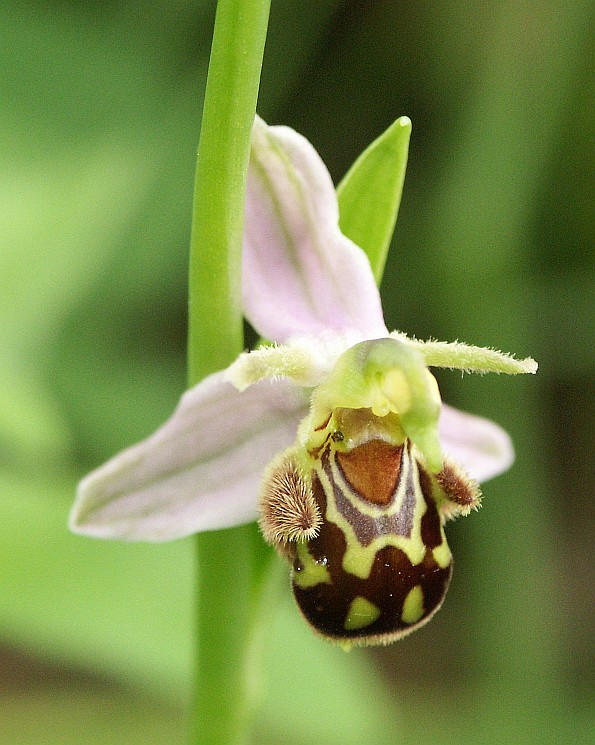
Bee orchid lures male bees to attempt to mate with the flower's lip, which resembles a bee perched on a pink flower.

=== As brood parasites ===
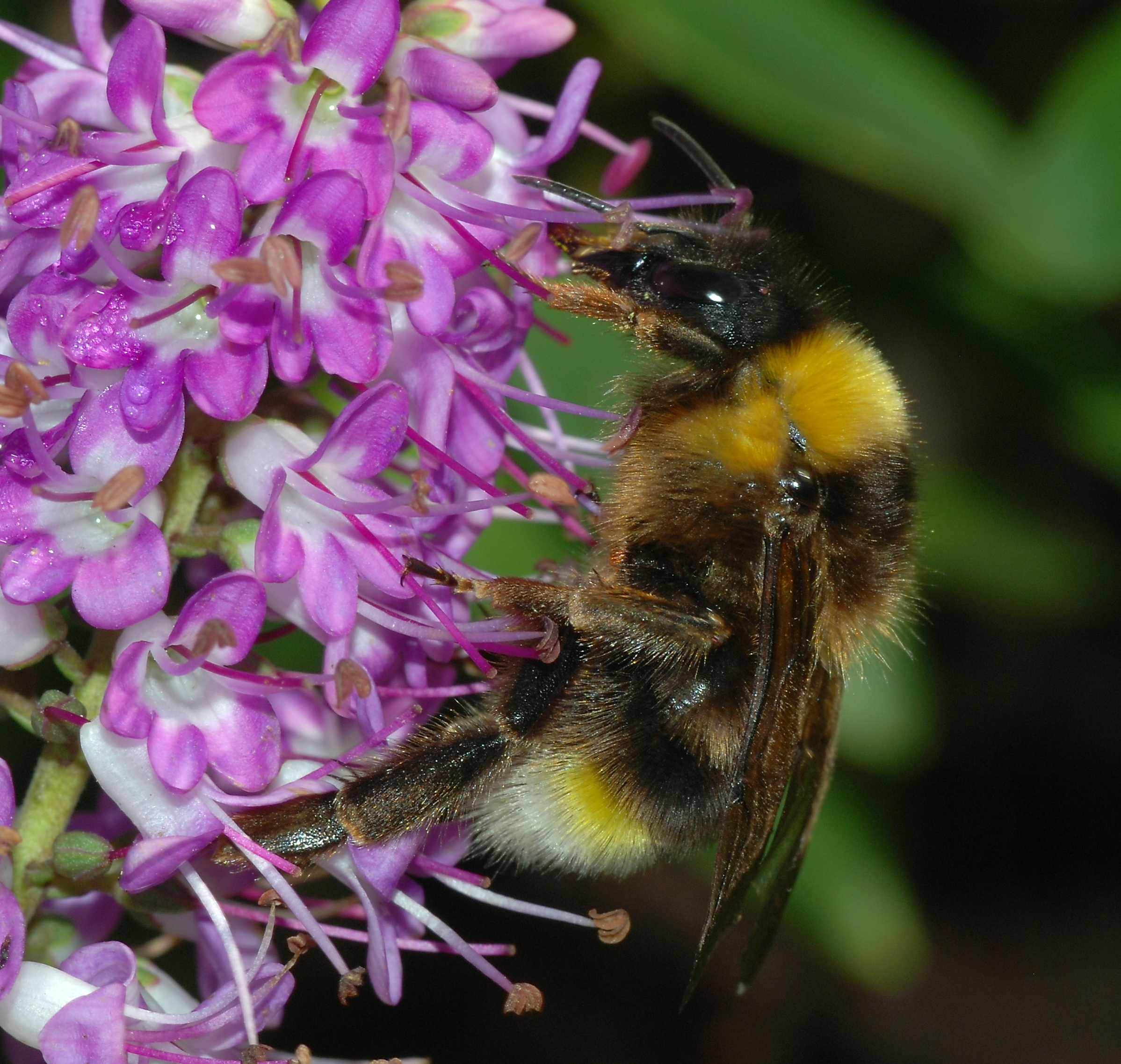
Bombus vestalis, a brood parasite of the bumblebee Bombus terrestris

Brood parasites occur in several bee families including the apid subfamily Nomadinae. Females of these species lack pollen collecting structures (the scopa) and do not construct their own nests. They typically enter the nests of pollen collecting species, and lay their eggs in cells provisioned by the host bee. When the "cuckoo" bee larva hatches, it consumes the host larva's pollen ball, and often the host egg also. In particular, the Arctic species of Bumblebee, Bombus hyperboreus, is an aggressive brood parasite that invades and enslaves colonies of other bumblebees within the same subgenus, Alpinobombus. Unlike most socially parasitic bumblebees, which have lost the ability to collect pollen, B. hyperboreus retains functional pollen baskets and has been observed gathering pollen and nectar in the field. This retention of foraging ability may be an adaptation to the severe Arctic climate, in which the short breeding season and limited availability of host colonies favor flexibility and a degree of metabolic self-reliance.

In Southern Africa, hives of African honeybees (A. mellifera scutellata) are being destroyed by parasitic workers of the Cape honeybee, A. m. capensis. These lay diploid eggs ("thelytoky"), escaping normal worker policing, leading to the colony's destruction; the parasites can then move to other hives.

The cuckoo bees in the Bombus subgenus Psithyrus are closely related to, and resemble, their hosts in looks and size. This common pattern gave rise to the ecological principle "Emery's rule". Others parasitize bees in different families, like Townsendiella, a nomadine apid, two species of which are cleptoparasites of the dasypodaid genus Hesperapis, while the other species in the same genus attacks halictid bees.

=== Nocturnal bees ===
Four bee families (Andrenidae, Colletidae, Halictidae, and Apidae) contain some species that are crepuscular. Most are tropical or subtropical, but some live in arid regions at higher latitudes. These bees have greatly enlarged ocelli, which are extremely sensitive to light and dark, though incapable of forming images. Some have refracting superposition compound eyes: these combine the output of many elements of their compound eyes to provide enough light for each retinal photoreceptor. Their ability to fly by night enables them to avoid many predators, and to exploit flowers that produce nectar only or also at night.

=== Predators, parasites and pathogens ===
Vertebrate predators of bees include bee-eaters, shrikes and flycatchers, which make short sallies to catch insects in flight. Swifts and swallows fly almost continually, catching insects as they go. The honey buzzard attacks bees' nests and eats the larvae. The greater honeyguide interacts with humans by guiding them to the nests of wild bees. The humans break open the nests and take the honey and the bird feeds on the larvae and the wax. Among mammals, predators such as the badger dig up bumblebee nests and eat both the larvae and any stored food.

Specialist ambush predators of visitors to flowers include crab spiders, which wait on flowering plants for pollinating insects; predatory bugs, and praying mantises, some of which (the flower mantises of the tropics) wait motionless, aggressive mimics camouflaged as flowers. Beewolves are large wasps that habitually attack bees; the ethologist Niko Tinbergen estimated that a single colony of the beewolf Philanthus triangulum might kill several thousand honeybees in a day: all the prey he observed were honeybees. Other predatory insects that sometimes catch bees include robber flies and dragonflies. Honey bees are affected by parasites including tracheal and Varroa mites. However, some bees are believed to have a mutualistic relationship with mites.

Some mites of the genus Tarsonemus are associated with bees. They live in bee nests and ride on adult bees for dispersal. They are presumed to feed on fungi, nest materials or pollen. However, the impact they have on bees remains uncertain.

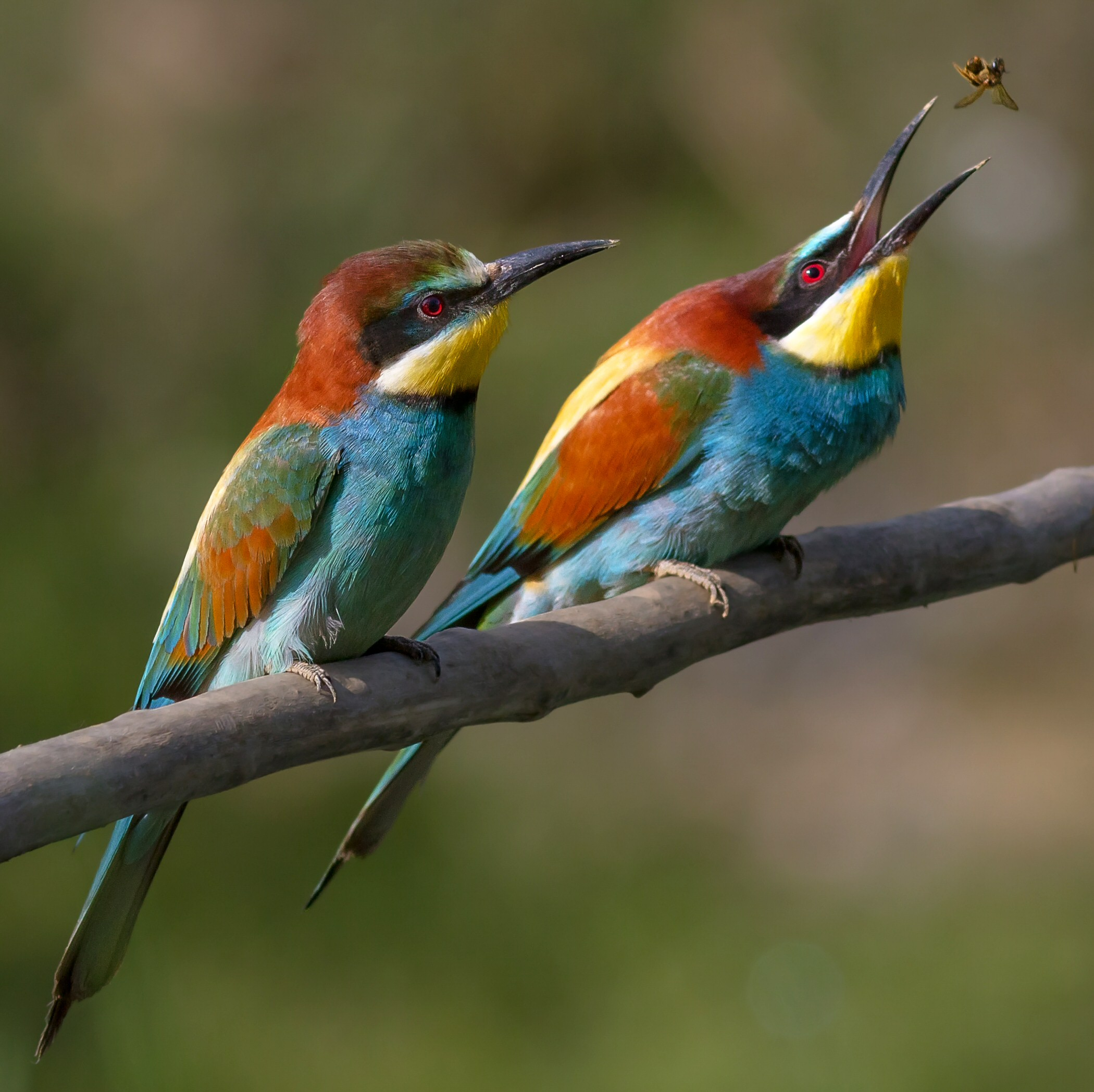
The bee-eater, Merops apiaster, specializes in feeding on bees; here a male catches a nuptial gift for his mate.

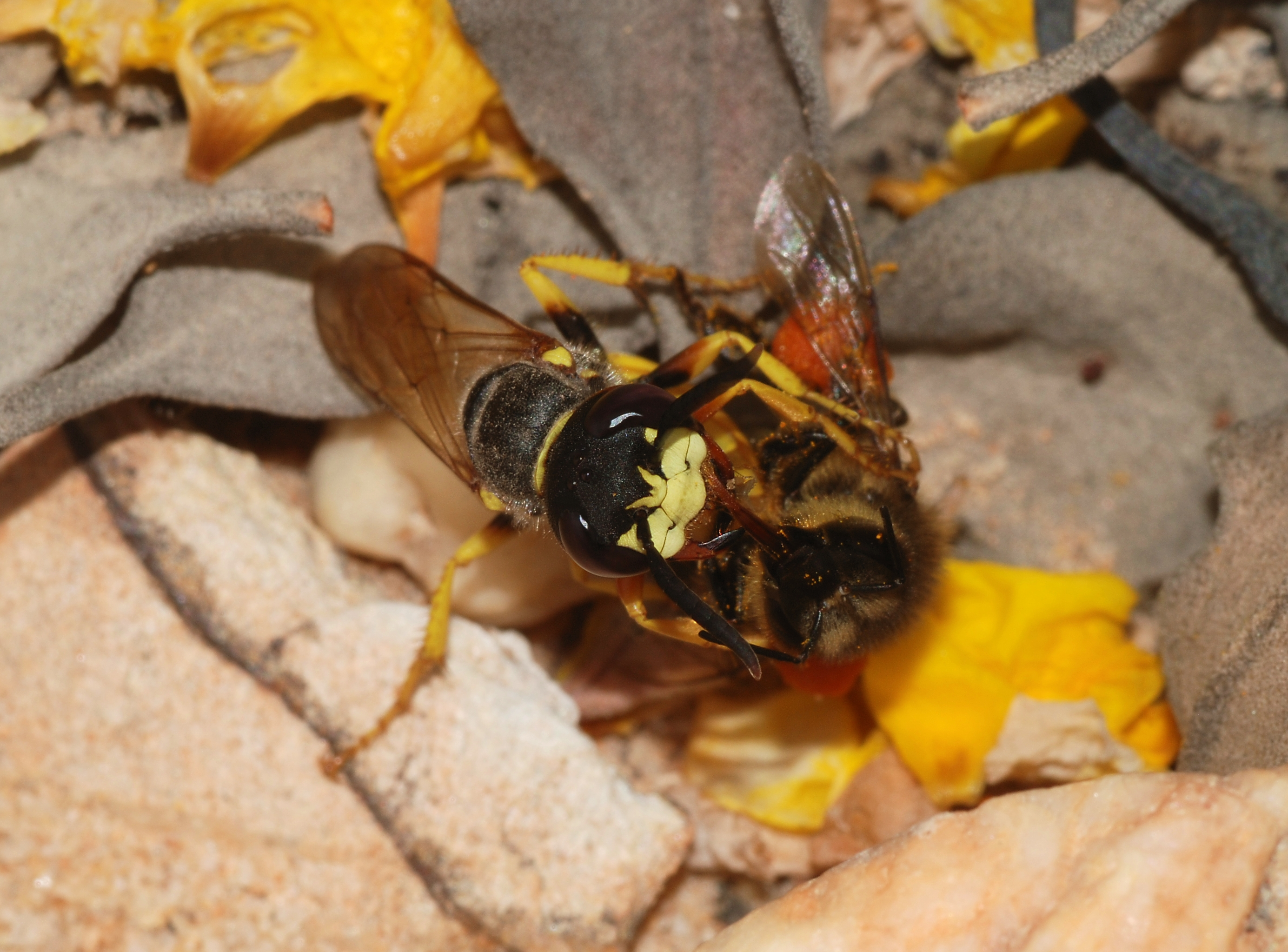
The beewolf Philanthus triangulum paralysing a bee with its sting

== Exposure to chemical stressors ==
Bees are exposed to a wide range of chemical stressors, both natural and synthetic, though their relative impacts differ sharply. Comparative toxicological studies indicate that synthetic insecticides, such as neonicotinoids, are 1,000 to 10,000 times more acutely toxic to honeybees than commonly encountered natural alkaloids such as nicotine and caffeine, which are among the most thoroughly studied plant secondary metabolites.

Insecticides remain the most damaging chemical stressor for bees. Neonicotinoids such as Imidacloprid, Clothianidin, and Thiamethoxam interfere with navigation, thermoregulation, and immune responses even at sub-lethal concentrations. Long-term exposure reduces colony growth, foraging success, and queen survival in both laboratory and field conditions. Following EFSA's 2018 risk assessment, outdoor agricultural uses of these active ingredients were banned throughout the European Union. Other synthetic insecticides, including organophosphates and pyrethroids, as well as some fungicide mixtures, act synergistically with parasites and pathogens such as Varroa destructor, a parasitic mite of honeybees, and Nosema ceranae, compounding the physiological stress on colonies. Industrial emissions and road traffic release traces of heavy metals such as cadmium, lead, and zinc, which can accumulate in hive products and bee tissues. These metals induce oxidative stress, developmental abnormalities and altered foraging behaviour. These substances are much less acutely toxic than insecticides, however their persistence and the fact that they are found everywhere results in chronic exposure that weakens immunity and increases disease susceptibility.

A minority of flowering plants produce secondary metabolites that can become toxic to pollinators when concentrated. Alkaloids, saponins and glycosides in species such as Aesculus californica (California buckeye) and Rhododendron spp. (grayanotoxins) can deter feeding or kill bees. However, some bees are resistant to Rhododendron toxins.

Chemical stressors affecting pollinators are best characterized by their acute and sublethal toxicity as well as ecological impact. In this way, synthetic insecticides consistently present the greatest risk across meta-analyses, followed by fungicides and certain industrial pollutants. Natural floral toxins (plant secondary metabolites) are typically sublethal. As well, they rarely drive population declines and are minor in impact compared to anthropogenic chemicals.

Overall, synthetic agrochemicals (particularly insecticides and some fungicides) and industrial pollutants remain the dominant chemical drivers of pollinator decline, whereas the majority of natural floral toxins have sublethal impacts that do not generally contribute to major population-level effects.

== Relationship with humans ==
=== In mythology and folklore ===
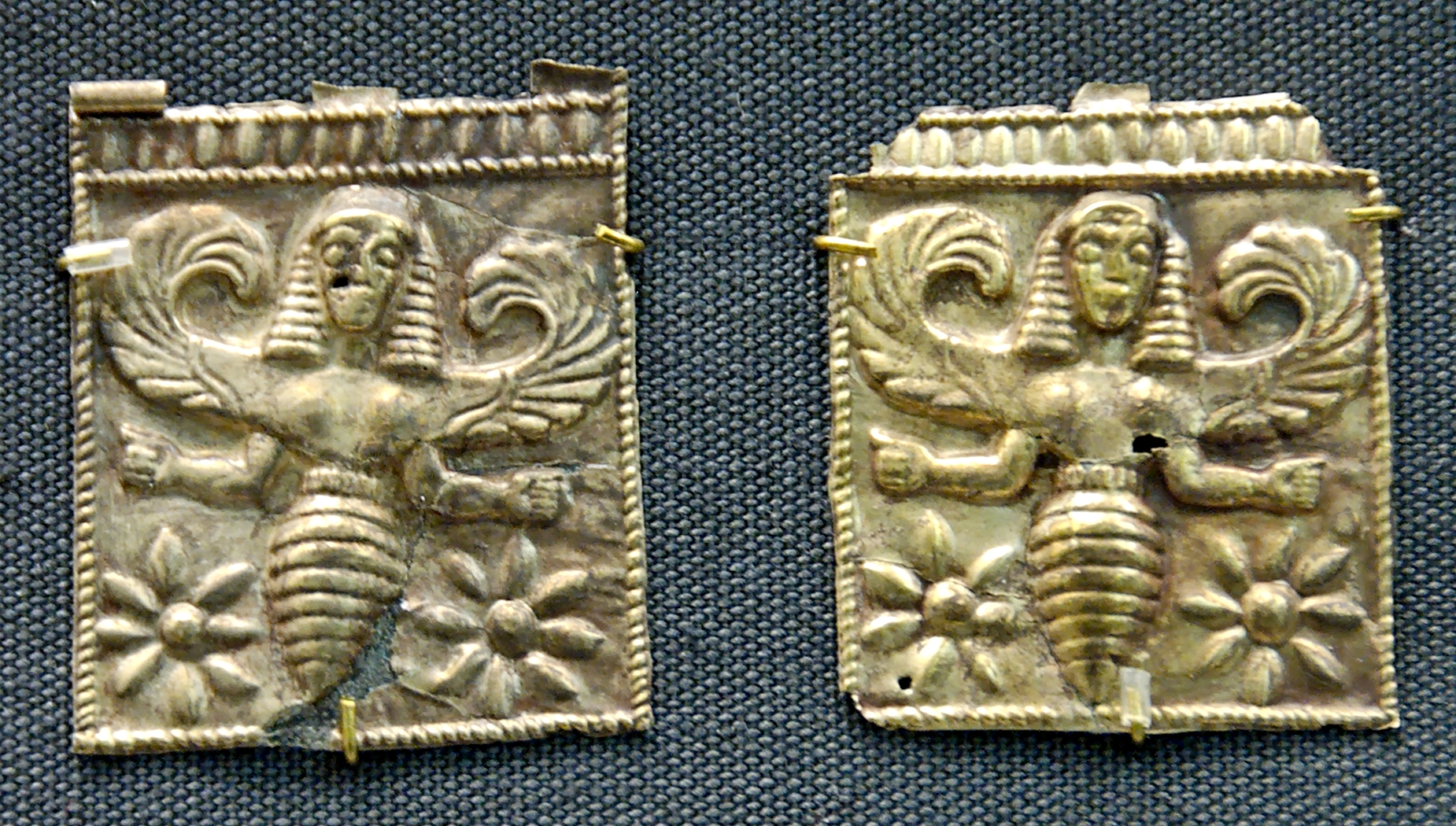
Gold plaques embossed with winged bee goddesses. Camiros, Rhodes. 7th century BC.

Homer's Hymn to Hermes describes three bee-maidens with the power of divination and thus speaking truth, and identifies the food of the gods as honey. Sources associated the bee maidens with Apollo and, until the 1980s, scholars followed Gottfried Hermann (1806) in incorrectly identifying the bee-maidens with the Thriae. Honey, according to a Greek myth, was discovered by a nymph called Melissa ("Bee"); and honey was offered to the Greek gods from Mycenean times. Bees were also associated with the Delphic oracle and the prophetess was sometimes called a bee.

The image of a community of honey bees has been used from ancient to modern times, in Aristotle and Plato; in Virgil and Seneca; in Erasmus and Shakespeare; Tolstoy, and by political and social theorists such as Bernard Mandeville and Karl Marx as a model for human society. In European folklore, bees would be told of important events in the household, in a custom known as "Telling the bees". Honey bees, signifying immortality and resurrection, were royal heraldic emblems of the Merovingians, revived by Napoleon.

=== In art and literature ===
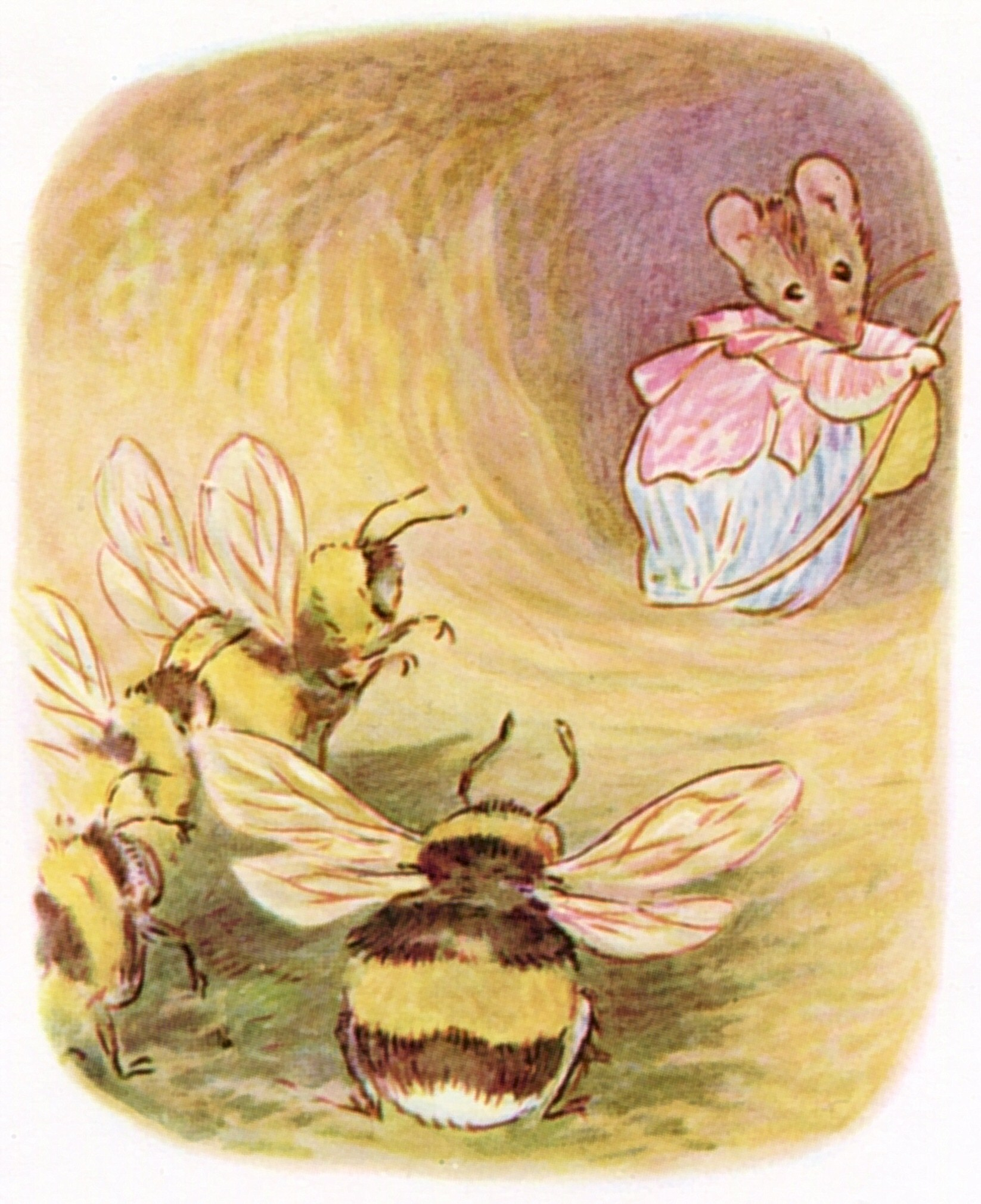
Beatrix Potter's illustration of Babbity Bumble in The Tale of Mrs Tittlemouse, 1910

Some of the oldest examples of bees in art are rock paintings in Spain which have been dated to 15,000 BC.

W. B. Yeats's poem The Lake Isle of Innisfree (1888) contains the couplet "Nine bean rows will I have there, a hive for the honey bee, / And live alone in the bee loud glade." At the time he was living in Bedford Park in the West of London. Beatrix Potter's illustrated book The Tale of Mrs Tittlemouse (1910) features Babbity Bumble and her brood (pictured). Kit Williams' treasure hunt book The Bee on the Comb (1984) uses bees and beekeeping as part of its story and puzzle. Sue Monk Kidd's The Secret Life of Bees (2004), and the 2009 film starring Dakota Fanning, tells the story of a girl who escapes her abusive home and finds her way to live with a family of beekeepers, the Boatwrights.

Bees have appeared in films such as Jerry Seinfeld's animated Bee Movie, or Eugene Schlusser's A Sting in the Tale (1989). The playwright Laline Paull's fantasy The Bees (2015) tells the tale of a hive bee named Flora 717 from hatching onwards.

=== Beekeeping ===
Humans have kept honey bee colonies, commonly in hives, for millennia. Depictions of humans collecting honey from wild bees date to 15,000 years ago; efforts to domesticate them are shown in Egyptian art around 4,500 years ago. Simple hives and smoke were used.

Beekeeping with the use of smoke is described in Aristotle's History of Animals Book 9. The account mentions that bees die after stinging; that workers remove corpses from the hive, and guard it; castes including workers and non-working drones, but "kings" rather than queens; predators including toads and bee-eaters; and the waggle dance, with the "irresistible suggestion" of άροσειονται ("aroseiontai", it waggles) and παρακολουθούσιν ("parakolouthousin", they watch). Beekeeping is described in detail by Virgil in his Georgics; it is mentioned in his Aeneid, and in Pliny's Natural History.

From the 18th century, European understanding of the colonies and biology of bees allowed the construction of the moveable comb hive so that honey could be harvested without destroying the colony.

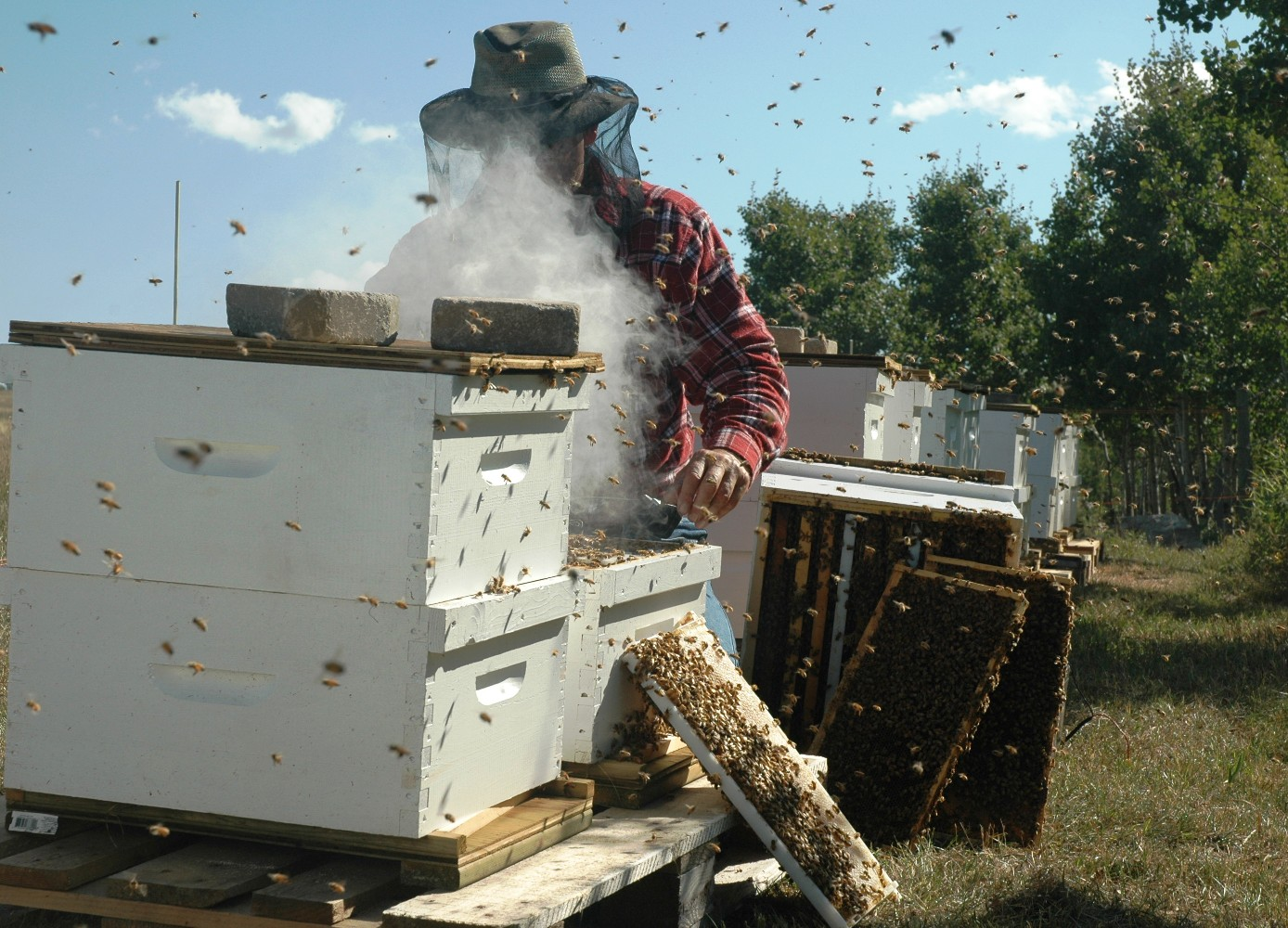
A commercial beekeeper at work

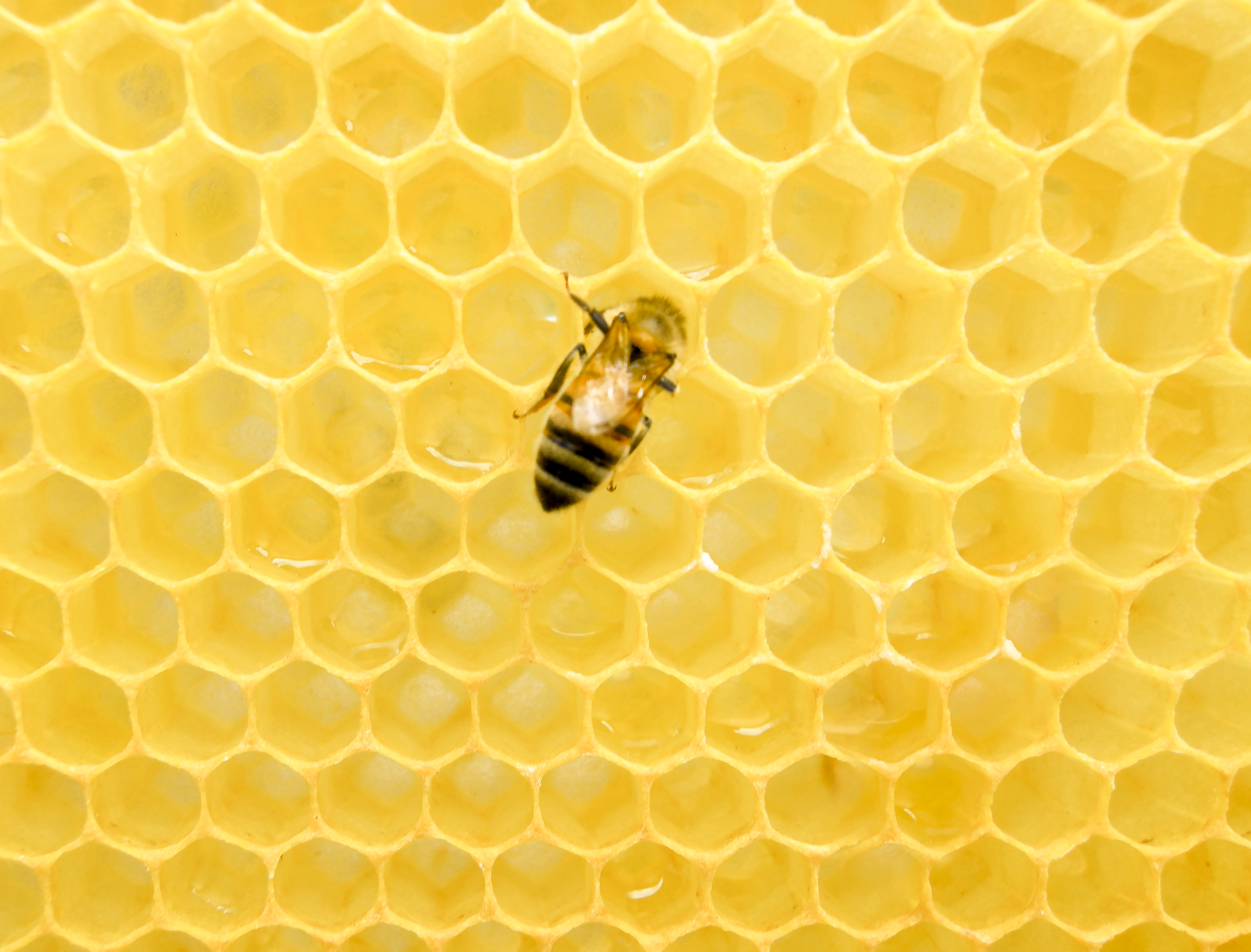
Western honey bee on a honeycomb

=== As commercial pollinators ===
Bees play an important role in pollinating flowering plants, and are the major type of pollinator in many ecosystems that contain flowering plants. It is estimated that one third of the human food supply depends on pollination by insects, birds and bats, most of which is accomplished by bees, whether wild or domesticated.

Since the 1970s, there has been a general decline in the species richness of wild bees and other pollinators, probably attributable to stress from increased parasites and disease, the use of pesticides, and a decrease in the number of wild flowers. Climate change probably exacerbates the problem. This is a major cause of concern, as it can cause biodiversity loss and ecosystem degradation as well as increase climate change.

Contract pollination has overtaken the role of honey production for beekeepers in many countries. After the introduction of Varroa mites, feral honey bees declined dramatically in the US, though their numbers have since recovered. The number of colonies kept by beekeepers declined slightly, through urbanization, systematic pesticide use, tracheal and Varroa mites, and the closure of beekeeping businesses. In 2006 and 2007 the rate of attrition increased, and was described as colony collapse disorder. In 2010 invertebrate iridescent virus and the fungus Nosema ceranae were shown to be in every killed colony, and deadly in combination. Winter losses increased to about 1/3. Varroa mites were thought to be responsible for about half the losses.

Apart from colony collapse disorder, losses outside the US have been attributed to causes including pesticide seed dressings, using neonicotinoids such as clothianidin, imidacloprid and thiamethoxam. From 2013 the European Union restricted some pesticides to stop bee populations from declining further. In 2014 the Intergovernmental Panel on Climate Change report warned that bees faced increased risk of extinction because of global warming. In 2018 the European Union decided to ban field use of all three major neonicotinoids; they remain permitted in veterinary, greenhouse, and vehicle transport usage.

Farmers have focused on alternative solutions to mitigate these problems. By raising native plants, they provide food for native bee pollinators like Lasioglossum vierecki and L. leucozonium.

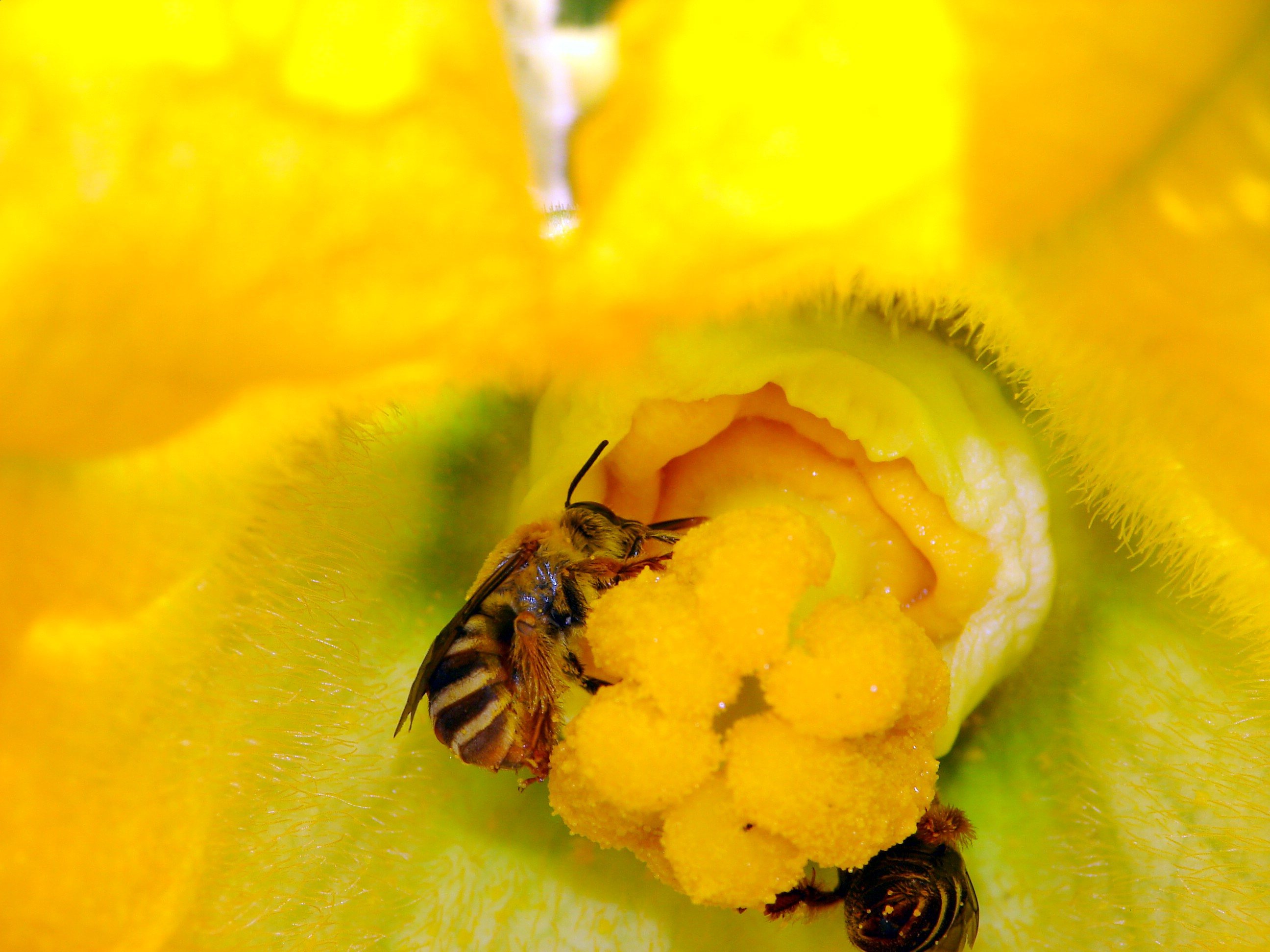
Squash bees (Apidae) are important pollinators of squashes and cucumbers.

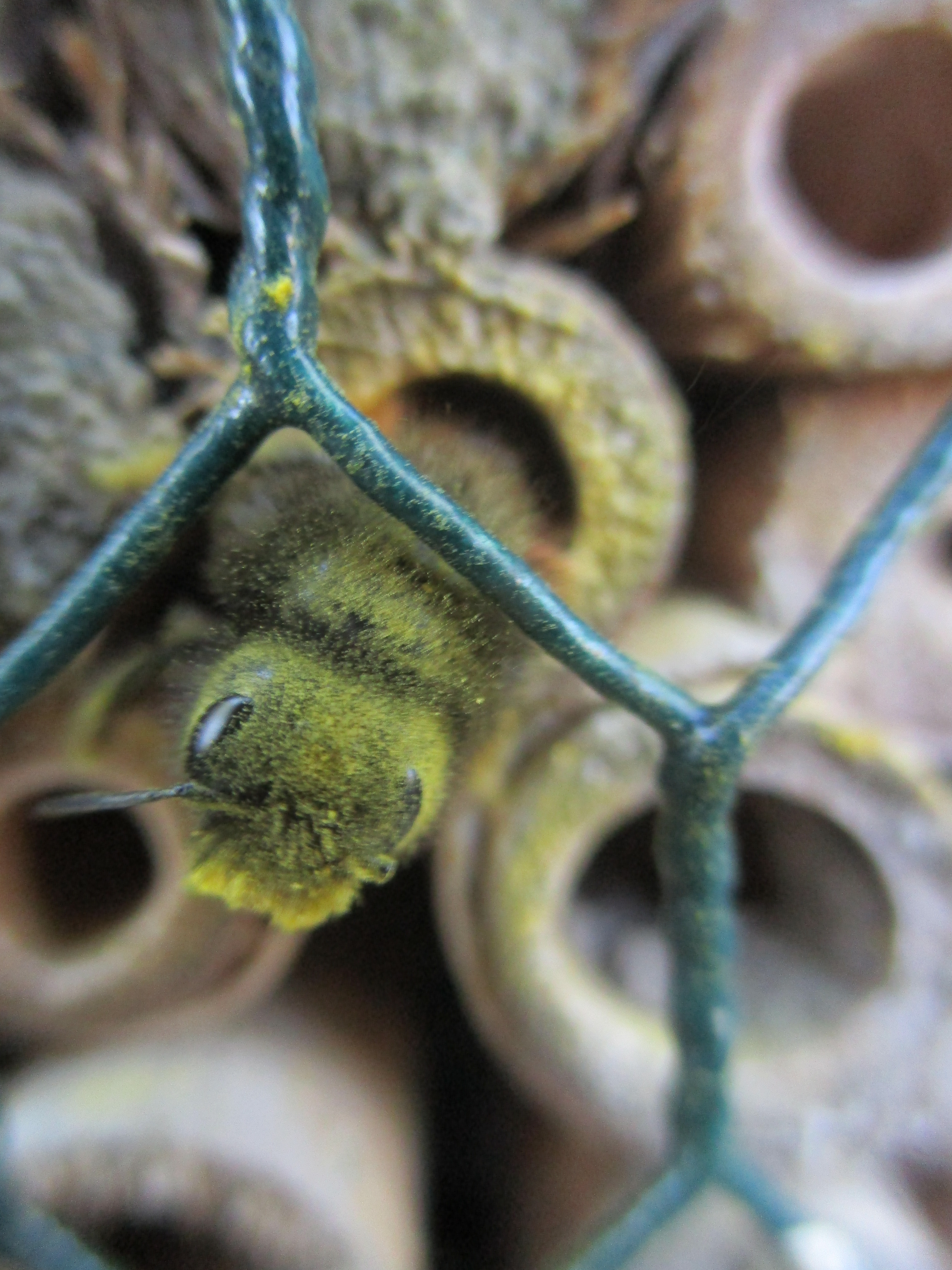
A mason bee (Osmia sp.) covered in pollen

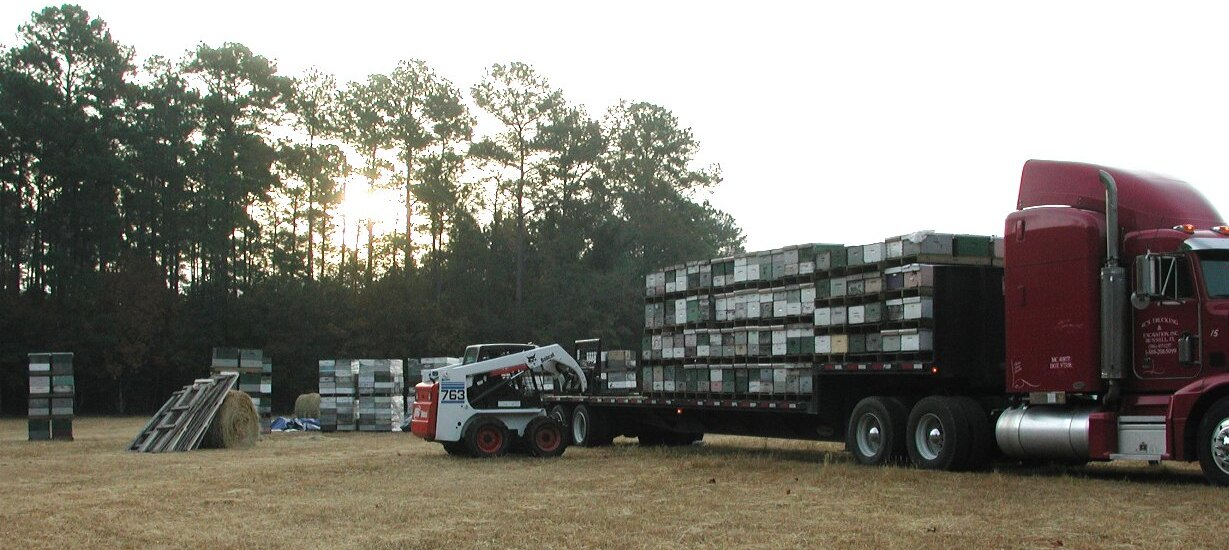
US migratory commercial beekeeper moving many hives of spring bees from South Carolina to Maine for blueberry pollination

=== As food producers ===
Honey is a natural product produced by bees and stored for their own use, but its sweetness has always appealed to humans. Before domestication of bees was even attempted, humans were raiding their nests for their honey. Smoke was often used to subdue the bees and such activities are depicted in rock paintings in Spain dated to 15,000 BC. Honey bees are used commercially to produce honey.

=== As food ===
Bees are considered edible insects. In countries where people eat insects, the bee brood (larvae, pupae and surrounding cells) of bees (primarily stingless species) may be eaten. In the Indonesian dish botok tawon from Central and East Java, bee larvae are eaten as a companion to rice, after being mixed with shredded coconut, wrapped in banana leaves, and steamed.

Bee brood (pupae and larvae) although low in calcium, has been found to be high in protein and carbohydrate, and a useful source of phosphorus, magnesium, potassium, and trace minerals iron, zinc, copper, and selenium. While bee brood is high in saturated and monounsaturated fatty acids, it contains no fat soluble vitamins (such as A, D, and E). Nevertheless, it is a good source of most of the water-soluble B vitamins (including choline) as well as vitamin C.

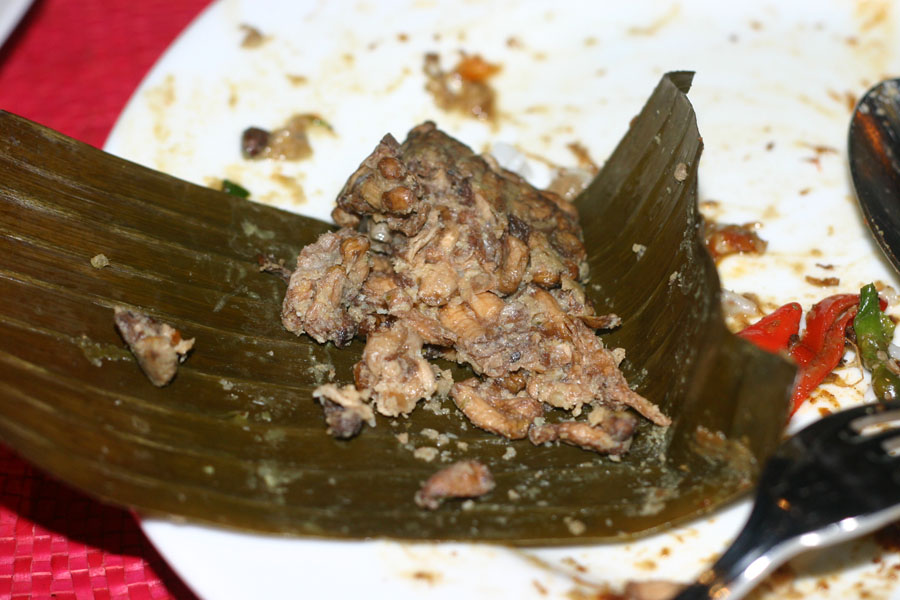
Bee larvae as food in the Javanese dish botok tawon

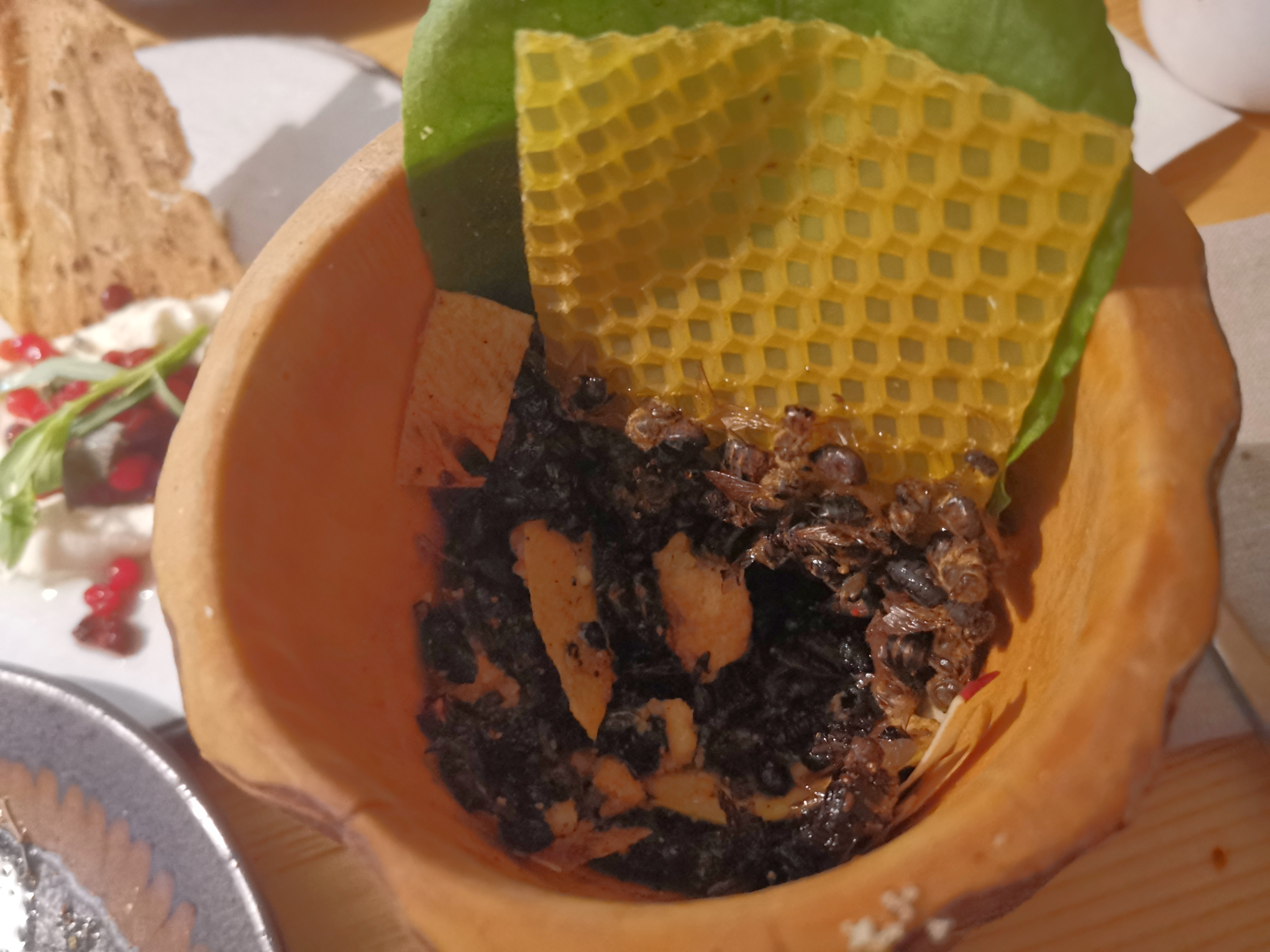
Fried whole bees served in a Ukrainian restaurant

=== As alternative medicine ===
Apitherapy is a branch of alternative medicine that uses honey bee products, including raw honey, royal jelly, pollen, propolis, beeswax and apitoxin (Bee venom). The claim that apitherapy treats cancer, which some proponents of apitherapy make, remains unsupported by evidence-based medicine.

=== Stings ===
The painful stings of bees are associated with the poison gland and the Dufour's gland which are abdominal exocrine glands containing various chemicals. In Lasioglossum leucozonium, the Dufour's Gland mostly contains octadecanolide as well as some eicosanolide. There is also evidence of n-triscosane, n-heptacosane, and 22-docosanolide.

== See also ==
- Australian native bees
- Fear of bees (apiphobia)
- Superorganism
- World Bee Day
