= C18H34O2 =

The molecular formula C_{18}H_{34}O_{2} (molar mass: 282.46 g/mol, exact mass: 282.2559 u) may refer to:

- Elaidic acid
- Octadecanolide
- Oleic acid
- Petroselinic acid
