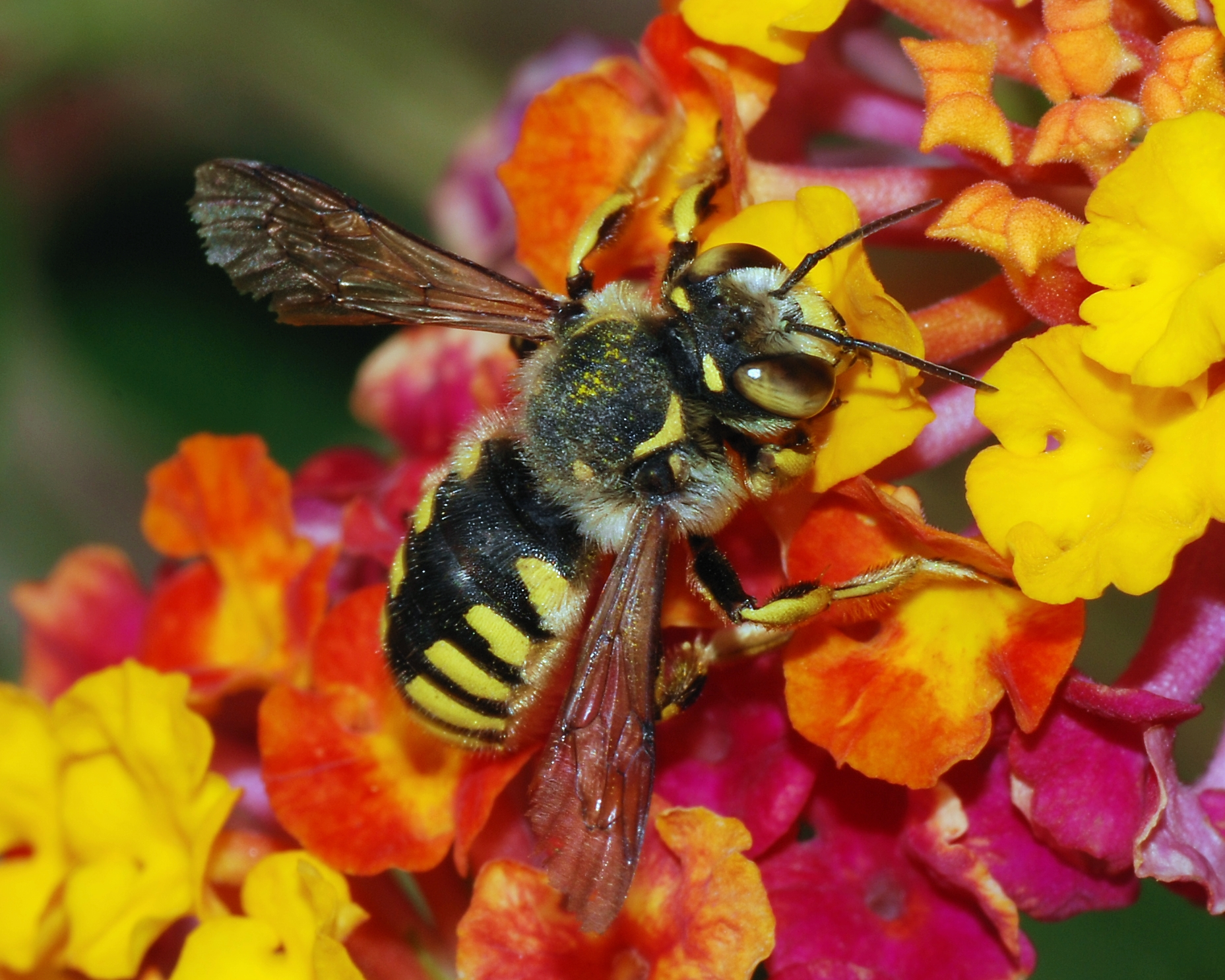

Scientific classification
- Kingdom: Animalia
- Phylum: Arthropoda
- Clade: Pancrustacea
- Class: Insecta
- Order: Hymenoptera
- Family: Megachilidae
- Genus: Anthidium
- Species: A. florentinum

Binomial name
- Anthidium florentinum (Fabricius,1775)

= Anthidium florentinum =

Species of bee

Anthidium florentinum, one of several European wool carder bees, is a territorial species of bee in the family Megachilidae, the leaf-cutter, carder, or mason bees.

== Description ==
The species is a medium to large bee. Both sexes have a black abdomen bearing two yellow bands on each tergite. The male can be distinguished by the grey and or whitish hairs on the sides of the abdomen. Females are smaller than males and have pale yellowish pollen brushes on the underside of the abdomen. The nest is made in a crevice or the abandoned nest of another insect and is lined with chewed plant fibres.

== Phenology ==
In both A. florentinum in southern France and A. manicatum in southern Germany, unlike the majority of solitary bees, a study found that there are more females than males, males are bigger than the females, and the sexes fly at the same times of year. P. Wirtz and colleagues suggest that this pattern is explained by the prolonged sexual receptivity of the females, along with the males' use of readily defended resources in their territories.

== Pollinator ==
A. florentinum obtained from Iran was found to be a more efficient pollinator of alfalfa in the United States than native species.
