= Eicosanolide =

Organic chemical compound

Names
- IUPAC name oxacyclohenicosan-2-one
- Other names 20-Eicosanolide

Identifiers
CAS Number	31844-01-6
3D model (JSmol)	Interactive image
ChEBI	CHEBI:180271
ChemSpider	9089195
PubChem CID	10913938
- InChI: InChI=1S/C20H38O2/c21-20-18-16-14-12-10-8-6-4-2-1-3-5-7-9-11-13-15-17-19-22-20/h1-19H2 Key: XNVIXRMFBUDCLP-UHFFFAOYSA-N
- SMILES: C1CCCCCCCCCC(=O)OCCCCCCCCC1

Properties
Chemical formula	C_{20}H_{38}O_{2}
Molar mass	310.522 g·mol^{−1}
- Except where otherwise noted, data are given for materials in their standard state (at 25 °C [77 °F], 100 kPa). Infobox references

Eicosanolide is an organic compound with the chemical formula C_{20}H_{38}O_{2}. It is a cyclic ester or lactone, more specifically a macrolide.

== Occurrence ==
Eicosanolide is used by several species of bees (such as some of genera Colletes, Lasioglossum, Halictus) and butterflies (such as some of genus Heliconius) as a pheromone. The Dufour's gland of bees in the Halictinae subfamily, contains eicosanolide along with other macrocyclic lactones, which could be used for a range of different applications like nest building, larval food and chemical communication.
