= Cretotrigona =

Cretotrigona Temporal range: Late Cretaceous (Maastrichtian), 70–66 Ma

Scientific classification
- Kingdom: Animalia
- Phylum: Arthropoda
- Clade: Pancrustacea
- Class: Insecta
- Order: Hymenoptera
- Family: Apidae
- Clade: Corbiculata
- Tribe: Meliponini
- Genus: †Cretotrigona; Engel, 2000
- Species: †C. prisca

Binomial name
- †Cretotrigona prisca (Michener & Grimaldi, 1988)

Synonyms
- †Trigona prisca Michener & Grimaldi, 1988

Genus of insects

Cretotrigona (meaning "Cretaceous Trigona") is an extinct genus of prehistoric stingless bee known from the Late Cretaceous, and the earliest known fossil bee. It contains a single species, C. prisca, known from New Jersey, United States.

The amber containing Cretotrigona was discovered by collector Alfred C. Hawkins in the 1920s or 1930s, in undifferentiated Maastrichtian-aged sediments near Kinkora in Burlington County. In the 1980s, researchers at the American Museum of Natural History studied this amber piece and identified a fossil bee within it, officially describing it as Trigona prisca and placing it within the extant genus Trigona. In 2000, further morphological analysis found evidence for placing it in its own genus, which was named Cretotrigona.

In addition to being the oldest known bee, the existence of Cretotrigona is significant for several reasons. Its occurrence in New Jersey is unique, as stingless bees are no longer found so far north, suggesting that the group likely evolved in South America, dispersed north to North America during the Late Cretaceous, but were eventually extirpated from there. The presence of such a derived bee belonging to an extant tribe in the Late Cretaceous suggests that significant divergence among bees must have already occurred prior to the end-Cretaceous extinction, despite no previous fossil evidence of this being preserved. In addition, the single preserved specimen of Cretotrigona appears to be of a worker bee, suggesting that eusociality had already evolved among bees by this point.
