= Gottfried Hermann =

Gottfried Hermann may refer to:

- Gottfried Hermann (gymnast), Austrian gymnast
- Johann Gottfried Jakob Hermann, German scholar
