= Bee (heraldry) =

Heraldic insignia

Napoléon III's imperial standard.

In ancient Egypt the bee was an insignia of kingship associated particularly with Lower Egypt, where there may even have been a Bee King in pre-dynastic times.

Honey bees, signifying immortality and resurrection, were thought to be royal emblems of the Merovingians, and revived by Napoleon as imperial bees, replacing the fleur de lys.

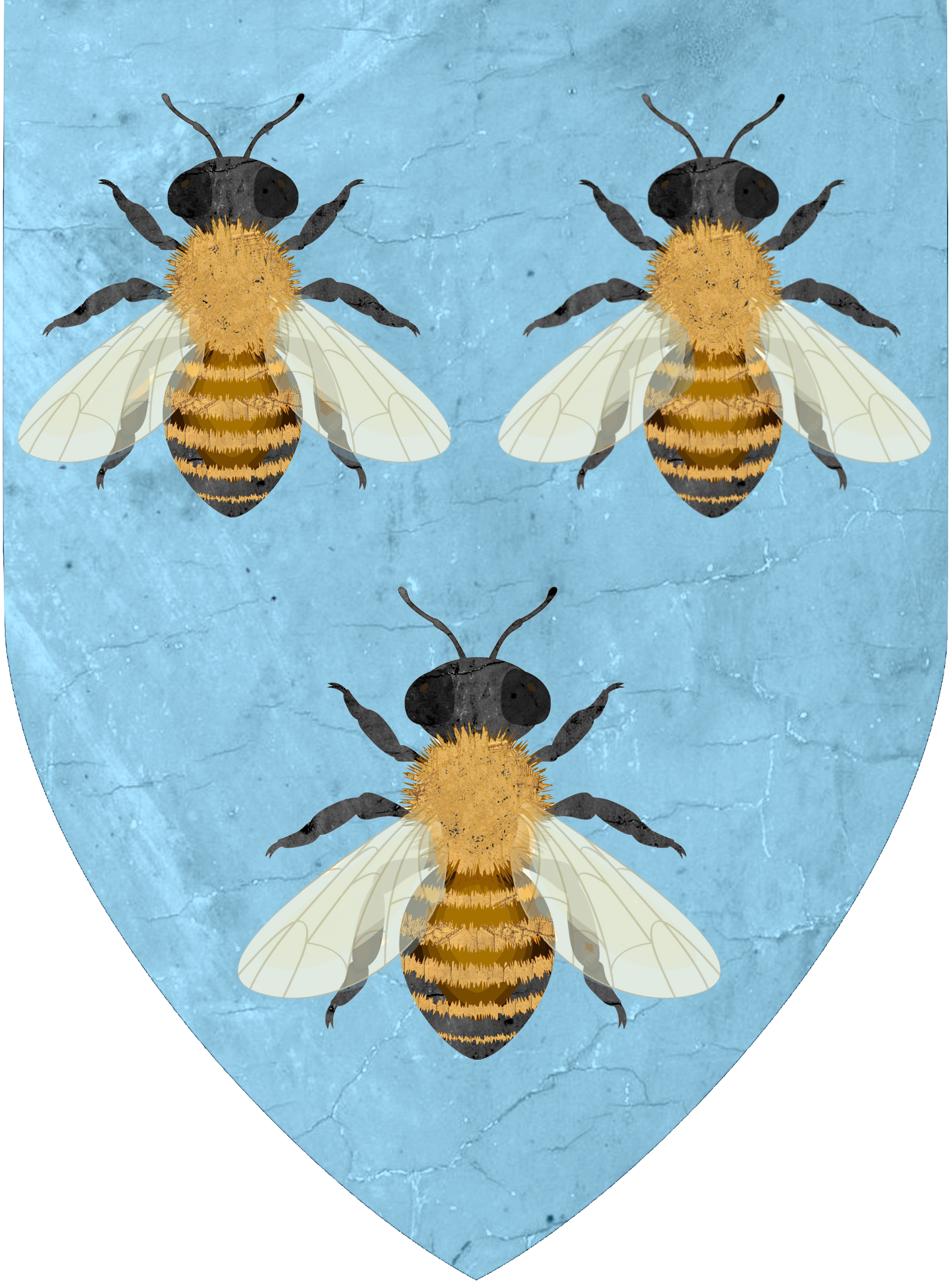
Barberini coat of arms by heraldic artist Dario Scaricamazza.

A community of honey bees has often been employed by political theorists as a model of human society. This metaphor occurs in Aristotle and Plato; in Virgil and Seneca; in Erasmus and Shakespeare and in Bernard Mandeville's Fable of the Bees, or Private Vices made Public Benefits, which influenced the economists Friedrich Hayek and John Maynard Keynes among others. Tolstoy similarly compares human society to a community of bees in War and Peace. Jean-Baptiste Simon titled his work of apiculture Le gouvernement admirable, ou, la république des abeilles (Paris, 1740).

The motif of the worker bee has been widely used to represent the city of Manchester as a symbol of industry.
