= Octadecanolide =

Organic chemical compound

Names
- IUPAC name oxacyclononadecan-2-one
- Other names: 1-oxacyclononadecan-2-one; 18-Octadecanolide

Identifiers
CAS Number	4444-85-3
3D model (JSmol)	Interactive image
ChEBI	CHEBI:191925
ChemSpider	10633281
PubChem CID	12628864
CompTox Dashboard (EPA)	DTXSID00504917
- InChI: InChI=1S/C18H34O2/c19-18-16-14-12-10-8-6-4-2-1-3-5-7-9-11-13-15-17-20-18/h1-17H2 Key: PGRBVLPTXLOMNB-UHFFFAOYSA-N
- SMILES: C1CCCCCCCCC(=O)OCCCCCCCC1

Properties
Chemical formula	C_{18}H_{34}O_{2}
Molar mass	282.468 g·mol^{−1}
- Except where otherwise noted, data are given for materials in their standard state (at 25 °C [77 °F], 100 kPa). Infobox references

Octadecanolide is an organic compound with the chemical formula C_{18}H_{34}O_{2}. It is a cyclic ester or lactone, more specifically a macrolide.

== Occurrence ==
Several species of bees (such as some of genera Colletes, Halictus, Lasioglossum) and butterflies (such as some of genus Heliconius) use octadecanolide as a pheromone. The Dufour's gland of bees in the Halictinae subfamily, contains octadecanolide along with other macrocyclic lactones, which could be used for a range of different applications like nest building, larval food and chemical communication.
