= List of Osmia species =

This is a list of 353 species in the genus Osmia, mason bees.

== Osmia species ==
- Osmia adae Bingham, 1897
- Osmia aeruginosa Warncke, 1988
- Osmia agilis Morawitz, 1875
- Osmia aglaia
- Osmia alaiensis van der Zanden, 1994
- Osmia albiventris Cresson, 1864
- Osmia albolateralis Cockerell, 1906
- Osmia alfkenii Ducke, 1899
- Osmia aliciae Ayala & Griswold, 2005
- Osmia alpestris Rust & Bohart, 1986
- Osmia alticola Benoist, 1922
- Osmia amathusica Mavromoustakis, 1937
- Osmia anceps Pérez, 1895
- Osmia andrenoides Spinola, 1808
- Osmia angustipes Cockerell, 1933
- Osmia apicata Smith, 1853
- Osmia aquila Warncke, 1988
- Osmia argyropyga Pérez, 1879
- Osmia ariadne Peters, 1978
- Osmia ashmeadii (Titus, 1904)
- Osmia atriventris Cresson, 1864
- Osmia atroalba Morawitz, 1875
- Osmia atrocyanea Cockerell, 1897
- Osmia atrorufa Friese, 1913
- Osmia aurulenta (Panzer, 1799)
- Osmia ausica Cockerell, 1944
- Osmia austromaritima Michener, 1936
- Osmia avedata Warncke, 1992
- Osmia avosetta Warncke, 1988
- Osmia azteca Cresson, 1878
- Osmia bakeri Sandhouse, 1924
- Osmia balearica Schmiedeknecht, 1885
- Osmia bella Cresson, 1878
- Osmia bicolor (Schrank, 1781)
- Osmia bischoffi Atanassov, 1938
- Osmia botitena Cockerell, 1909
- Osmia breviata Warncke, 1988
- Osmia brevicornis (Fabricius, 1798)
- Osmia brevipes van der Zanden, 1994
- Osmia brevis Cresson, 1864
- Osmia bruneri Cockerell, 1897
- Osmia bucephala Cresson, 1864 (bufflehead mason bee)
- Osmia caerulescens (Linnaeus, 1758)
- Osmia cahuilla Cooper, 1993
- Osmia calaminthae (Melanosmia) calaminthae Rightmyer, Ascher & Griswold (calamintha osmia)
- Osmia calcarata White, 1952
- Osmia californica Cresson, 1864
- Osmia calla Cockerell, 1897
- Osmia capicola Friese, 1906
- Osmia cara Cockerell, 1910
- Osmia carinoclypearis Wu, 1985
- Osmia caulicola Cockerell, 1934
- Osmia cephalotes Morawitz, 1870
- Osmia cerasi Cockerell, 1897
- Osmia cerinthidis Morawitz, 1876
- Osmia chalybea Smith, 1853
- Osmia chinensis Morawitz, 1890
- Osmia chrysaetos Warncke, 1988
- Osmia chrysolepta Haeseler, 2005
- Osmia cinctella Dours, 1873
- Osmia cinerea Warncke, 1988
- Osmia cinnabarina Pérez, 1895
- Osmia claremontensis Michener, 1936
- Osmia clarescens Cockerell, 1911
- Osmia clypearis Morawitz, 1871
- Osmia cobaltina Cresson, 1878
- Osmia cockerelli Sandhouse, 1939
- Osmia collinsiae Robertson, 1905
- Osmia coloradensis Cresson, 1878 (Colorado osmia)
- Osmia concavoclypearis Wu, 1985
- Osmia conjuncta Cresson, 1864
- Osmia cordata Robertson, 1902
- Osmia corniculata (van der Zanden, 1989)
- Osmia cornifrons (Radoszkowski, 1887) (hornfaced bee)
- Osmia cornuta (Latreille, 1805)
- Osmia crassa Rust & Bohart, 1986
- Osmia croceiventris Radoszkowski, 1882
- Osmia cyanella Cockerell, 1897
- Osmia cyaneonitens Cockerell, 1906
- Osmia cyanescens Morawitz, 1875
- Osmia cyanopoda Cockerell, 1916
- Osmia cyanoxantha Pérez, 1879
- Osmia cyrenaica Peters, 1978
- Osmia dakotensis Michener, 1937
- Osmia damascena Pérez, 1911
- Osmia decorata Morawitz, 1886
- Osmia densa Cresson, 1864
- Osmia derasa Pérez, 1895
- Osmia difficilis Morawitz, 1875
- Osmia dilaticornis Morawitz, 1875
- Osmia dimidiata Morawitz, 1870
- Osmia diomedia Warncke, 1988
- Osmia disjuncta Tkalcu, 1995
- Osmia distincta Cresson, 1864
- Osmia dives Mocsáry, 1877
- Osmia dlabolae Tkalcu, 1978
- Osmia dolerosa Sandhouse, 1939
- Osmia dusmeti van der Zanden, 1998
- Osmia ednae Cockerell, 1907
- Osmia emarginata Lepeletier, 1841
- Osmia enixa Sandhouse, 1924
- Osmia ephippiata Smith, 1879
- Osmia erythrogastra Ferton, 1905
- Osmia excavata Alfken, 1903
- Osmia exigua Cresson, 1878
- Osmia fasciata Latreille, 1811
- Osmia fedtschenkoi Morawitz, 1875
- Osmia felti Cockerell, 1911
- Osmia ferruginea Latreille, 1811
- Osmia fervida Smith, 1853
- Osmia flavipes Friese, 1909
- Osmia forticornis van der Zanden, 1989
- Osmia foxi Cameron, 1901
- Osmia francisconis White, 1952
- Osmia frieseana Ducke, 1899
- Osmia frunseensis Warncke, 1992
- Osmia gabrielis Cockerell, 1910
- Osmia gallarum Spinola, 1808
- Osmia gaudiosa Cockerell, 1907
- Osmia gemmea Pérez, 1896
- Osmia georgica Cresson, 1878
- Osmia giffardi Sandhouse, 1939
- Osmia giliarum Cockerell, 1906
- Osmia glareola Warncke, 1988
- Osmia glauca (Fowler, 1899)
- Osmia gracilicornis Pérez, 1895
- Osmia granulosa Cockerell, 1911
- Osmia grindeliae Cockerell, 1910
- Osmia grinnelli Cockerell, 1910
- Osmia gulmargensis Nurse, 1903
- Osmia gutturalis Warncke, 1988
- Osmia haemorrhoa Morawitz, 1886
- Osmia heliaca Warncke, 1988
- Osmia helicicola Robinaeau, 1836
- Osmia hellados van der Zanden, 1984
- Osmia hemera Sandhouse, 1939
- Osmia hendersoni Cockerell, 1907
- Osmia hermona Warncke, 1992
- Osmia hesperos Sandhouse, 1939
- Osmia heteracantha Pérez, 1896
- Osmia hurdi White, 1952
- Osmia hyperborea Tkalcu, 1983
- Osmia iberica van der Zanden, 1987
- Osmia illinoensis Robertson, 1897
- Osmia imitatrix (Tkalcu, 1992)
- Osmia indeprensa Sandhouse, 1939
- Osmia indigotea Morawitz, 1875
- Osmia inermis (Zetterstedt, 1838)
- Osmia inspergens Lovell & Cockerell, 1907
- Osmia integra Cresson, 1878
- Osmia interrupta Latreille, 1811
- Osmia inurbana Cresson, 1878
- Osmia iridis Cockerell & Titus, 1902
- Osmia ishikawai Hirashima, 1973
- Osmia jacoti Cockerell, 1929
- Osmia jason Benoist, 1929
- Osmia jilinensis Wu, 2004
- Osmia juxta Cresson, 1864
- Osmia karooensis Brauns, 1926
- Osmia kashmirensis Nurse, 1903
- Osmia kenoyeri Cockerell, 1915
- Osmia kincaidii Cockerell, 1897
- Osmia kirgisiana van der Zanden, 1994
- Osmia kohli Ducke, 1899
- Osmia labialis Pérez, 1879
- Osmia lacus Sandhouse, 1939
- Osmia laeta Sandhouse, 1924
- Osmia lanei Sandhouse, 1939
- Osmia laticauda Stanek, 1969
- Osmia laticella van der Zanden, 1986
- Osmia latisulcata Michener, 1936
- Osmia latreillei (Spinola, 1806)
- Osmia lazulina Benoist, 1928
- Osmia leaiana (Kirby, 1802)
- Osmia lhotelleriei Pérez, 1887
- Osmia lignaria Say, 1837 (blue orchard bee)
- Osmia liogastra Cockerell, 1933
- Osmia livida Tkalcu, 1978
- Osmia lobata Friese, 1899
- Osmia longicornis Morawitz, 1875
- Osmia longula Cresson, 1864
- Osmia lunata Benoist, 1929
- Osmia lupinicola Cockerell, 1937
- Osmia madeirensis van der Zanden, 1991
- Osmia malina Cockerell, 1909
- Osmia maracandica Morawitz, 1894
- Osmia marginata Michener, 1936
- Osmia marginipennis Cresson, 1878
- Osmia maritima Friese, 1885
- Osmia maxillaris Morawitz, 1875
- Osmia mediana Engel, 2006
- Osmia mediorufa Cockerell, 1932
- Osmia melanocephala Morawitz, 1875
- Osmia melanogaster Spinola, 1808
- Osmia melanopleura Cockerell, 1916
- Osmia melanota Morawitz, 1888
- Osmia melanura Morawitz, 1872
- Osmia mertensiae Cockerell, 1907
- Osmia michiganensis Mitchell, 1962
- Osmia microdonta Cockerell, 1931
- Osmia microgramma Dours, 1873
- Osmia milenae Tkalcu, 1992
- Osmia mirhiji Mavromoustakis, 1957
- Osmia mixta Michener, 1936
- Osmia mongolica Morawitz, 1880
- Osmia montana Cresson, 1864
- Osmia moreensis van der Zanden, 1984
- Osmia morongana Cockerell, 1937
- Osmia mustelina Gerstäcker, 1869
- Osmia mutensis Peters, 1978
- Osmia namaquaensis Friese, 1913
- Osmia nana Morawitz, 1873
- Osmia nanula Cockerell, 1897
- Osmia nasoproducta Ferton, 1909
- Osmia nasuta Friese, 1899
- Osmia natalensis Cockerell, 1920
- Osmia nemoris Sandhouse, 1924
- Osmia neocyanopoda Rust & Bohart, 1986
- Osmia nifoata Cockerell, 1909
- Osmia nigricollis Warncke, 1992
- Osmia nigrifrons Cresson, 1878
- Osmia nigritula Friese, 1902
- Osmia nigriventris (Zetterstedt, 1838)
- Osmia nigrobarbata Cockerell, 1916
- Osmia nigrohirta Friese, 1899
- Osmia nigroscopula (Wu, 1982)
- Osmia niveata (Fabricius, 1804)
- Osmia niveibarbis Pérez, 1902
- Osmia niveocincta Pérez, 1879
- Osmia notata (Fabricius, 1804)
- Osmia novaescotiae Cockerell, 1912
- Osmia nuda Friese, 1899
- Osmia obliqua White, 1952
- Osmia ocularis Warncke, 1988
- Osmia odontogaster Cockerell, 1897
- Osmia ogilviae Cockerell, 1932
- Osmia onocrotala Warncke, 1988
- Osmia opima Romankova, 1985
- Osmia oramara Warncke, 1992
- Osmia orientalis Benoist, 1929
- Osmia ornatula Cockerell, 1932
- Osmia pachyceps Friese, 1922
- Osmia pagosa Sandhouse, 1939
- Osmia palmae Tkalcu, 2001
- Osmia palmyrae van der Zanden, 1998
- Osmia pamirensis Gussakovsky, 1930
- Osmia paradisica Sandhouse, 1924
- Osmia parietina Curtis, 1828
- Osmia pedicornis Cockerell, 1919
- Osmia pennata Warncke, 1988
- Osmia pentstemonis Cockerell, 1906
- Osmia peregrina Warncke, 1988
- Osmia phenax Cockerell, 1897
- Osmia physariae Cockerell, 1907
- Osmia pieli Cockerell, 1931
- Osmia pikei Cockerell, 1907
- Osmia pilicornis Smith, 1846
- Osmia piliventris Friese, 1913
- Osmia pingreeana Michener, 1937
- Osmia polkruga Warncke, 1992
- Osmia potentillae Michener, 1936
- Osmia pratincola Warncke, 1988
- Osmia proxima Cresson, 1864
- Osmia prunorum Cockerell, 1897
- Osmia pulsatillae Cockerell, 1907
- Osmia pumila Cresson, 1864
- Osmia punica Pérez, 1896
- Osmia purpurata Ducke, 1899
- Osmia pusilla Cresson, 1864
- Osmia quadricornuta Wu, 2004
- Osmia quadridentata (Dumeril, 1860)
- Osmia ramona Warncke, 1992
- Osmia raritatis Michener, 1957
- Osmia rawlinsi Sandhouse, 1939
- Osmia recta Pérez, 1902
- Osmia reginae Cockerell, 1932
- Osmia regulina Cockerell, 1911
- Osmia relicta (Popov, 1954)
- Osmia rhodoensis (van der Zanden, 1983)
- Osmia rhodognatha Cockerell, 1932
- Osmia ribifloris Cockerell, 1900 (blueberry bee)
- Osmia rostrata Sandhouse, 1924
- Osmia rufa (Linnaeus, 1758)
- Osmia rufigastra Lepeletier, 1841
- Osmia rufina Cockerell, 1931
- Osmia rufinoides Wu, 2004
- Osmia rufohirta Latreille, 1811
- Osmia rufotibialis Friese, 1920
- Osmia rutila Erichson, 1835
- Osmia sanctaerosae Cockerell, 1910
- Osmia sandhouseae Mitchell, 1927
- Osmia sanrafaelae Parker, 1985
- Osmia satoi Yasumatsu & Hirashima, 1950
- Osmia saxatilis Warncke, 1988
- Osmia saxicola Ducke, 1899
- Osmia sculleni Sandhouse, 1939
- Osmia scutispina Gribodo, 1894
- Osmia sedula Sandhouse, 1924
- Osmia sequoiae Michener, 1936
- Osmia sexsignata Benoist, 1950
- Osmia shaanxiensis Wu, 2004
- Osmia signata Erichson, 1835
- Osmia simillima Smith, 1853
- Osmia simplex Morawitz, 1875
- Osmia sladeni Sandhouse, 1925
- Osmia sogdiana Morawitz, 1875
- Osmia solitaria Sandhouse, 1924
- Osmia sparsipuncta Alfken, 1914
- Osmia sponsa Nurse, 1904
- Osmia stangei Genaro, 2001
- Osmia steinmanni Müller, 2002
- Osmia subaustralis Cockerell, 1900
- Osmia subcornuta Morawitz, 1875
- Osmia subfasciata Cresson, 1872
- Osmia submicans Morawitz, 1870
- Osmia subtersa Cockerell, 1930
- Osmia svenssoni Tkalcu, 1983
- Osmia sybarita Smith, 1853
- Osmia tadjika Warncke, 1992
- Osmia tanneri Sandhouse, 1939
- Osmia tarsata Provancher, 1888
- Osmia taurus Smith, 1873
- Osmia tawildara Warncke, 1992
- Osmia tergestensis Ducke, 1897
- Osmia tersula Cockerell, 1912
- Osmia teunisseni van der Zanden, 1981
- Osmia texana Cresson, 1872 (Texas osmia)
- Osmia thoracica Radoszkowski, 1874
- Osmia thysanisca Michener, 1957
- Osmia tingitana Benoist, 1969
- Osmia titusi Cockerell, 1905
- Osmia tokopahensis Michener, 1936
- Osmia torquata Warncke, 1988
- Osmia trevoris Cockerell, 1897
- Osmia tricornis Latreille, 1811
- Osmia tricuspidata Dours, 1873
- Osmia trifoliama Sandhouse, 1939
- Osmia tristella Cockerell, 1897
- Osmia tunensis (Fabricius, 1787)
- Osmia turneri Cockerell, 1937
- Osmia unca Michener, 1937
- Osmia uncicornis Pérez, 1895
- Osmia uncinata Gerstäcker, 1869
- Osmia universitatis Cockerell, 1907
- Osmia vandykei Sandhouse, 1924
- Osmia versicolor Latreille, 1811
- Osmia virga Sandhouse, 1939
- Osmia viridana Morawitz, 1874
- Osmia watsoni Cockerell, 1911
- Osmia xanthomelana (Kirby, 1802)
- Osmia yanbianensis Wu, 2004
- Osmia zarzisa Warncke, 1992
- Osmia zephyros Sandhouse, 1939
