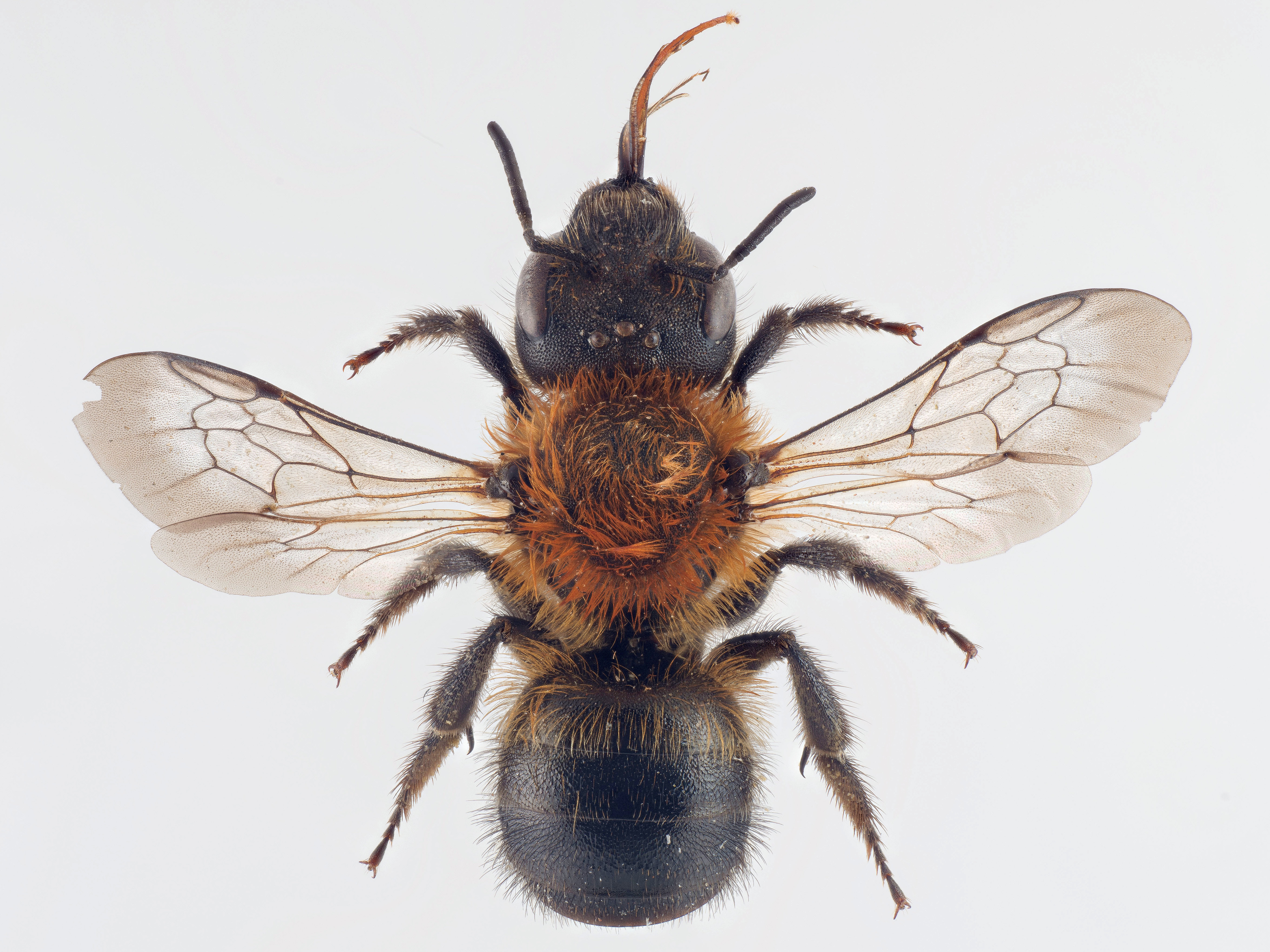

Conservation status
- Least Concern (IUCN 3.1)

Scientific classification
- Kingdom: Animalia
- Phylum: Arthropoda
- Clade: Pancrustacea
- Class: Insecta
- Order: Hymenoptera
- Family: Megachilidae
- Genus: Osmia
- Species: O. uncinata

Binomial name
- Osmia uncinata Gerstäcker,1869

= Osmia uncinata =

Species of bee

Osmia uncinata, the pinewood mason bee, is a species of solitary bee from the family Megachilidae It is an Arctic-alpine species which is found in the northern Palearctic, in the United Kingdom it is a Biodiversity Action Plan priority species.

== Description ==
Osmia uncinata is a wasp like mason bee with a yellow and black striped thorax which is quite variable in its colour and the degree of hairiness shown. They measure between 7mm and 15mm in length.

== Habitat ==
In Great Britain Osmia uncinata is closely associated with relicts of the ancient Caledonian Forest, being found in woodland clearings, along paths through woodland, and on adjacent roadside verges where the principal forage plant, birds-foot trefoil Lotus corniculatus, is well established.

== Distribution ==
In the United Kingdom Osmia uncinata is confined to the northern Scotland. In Europe its distribution covers northern Europe and the mountains of central Europe east into Asiatic Russia.

== Biology ==
In Scotland the flight period is from late April or May to early July. This species has a single-brood in any season. It chooses preexisting cavities: insect burrows in dead wood or bark, especially those of the longhorn beetle Rhagium inquisitor and has used drilled borings in wooden blocks; between the thick bark of pine trees. The cell partitions and nest plug are made of leaf mastic. The nesting sites require full exposure to the sun. The eggs are laid in these small cells, which the female then seals with a reserve of food. The larva develops to a pupa and an adult while sealed in the cocoon, where it overwinters. The adults emerge in the spring to mate and to set up their own nests.

On the continent Osmia uncinata is polylectic and has been recorded as utilising pollen sources from plants belonging to 10 different families. In Scotland, both males and females have been observed visiting Lotus corniculatus, broom Cytisus scoparius, bilberry Vaccinium myrtillus and rowan Sorbus aucuparia, but these latter three may be nectar sources for the adults only Meadows which border pine woods are possibly an important source of food by providing nectar to fuel the adults' flight and pollen to be provided for the larvae.

The chrysidid wasp Chrysura hirsuta which is a known parasitoid of the closely related Osmia inermis, may also be a parasitoid of Osmia uncinata as the wasp has been found in woodland sites where O. uncinata also occurs while O. inermis is not found in woodland.

== Conservation ==
In Scotland it is Listed as vulnerable, the main threats to Osmia uncinata are the reduction of available habitat, the loss of the open areas within the forest and increased shading of the forage plants. Dead pine wood should be retained to provide nest sites, and the natural regeneration of the forest should be encouraged. As this species has a boreo-alpine distribution, the relict populations in Scotland are probably going to be negatively affected by anthropogenic climate change. Measures taken to conserve other species found in Caledonian forest should benefit this species. Attempts to encourage them to use artificial nests in Scotland were unsuccessful but did find other rare species of arthropod such as Clubiona subsultans. Osmia uncinata may be rare in Scotland due to a combination of the limited availability of the combination of old trees in sunny positions, beetle burrows (especially as Rhagium inquisitor is a scarce species in Scotland), and the availability of patches of bird's-foot trefoil.
