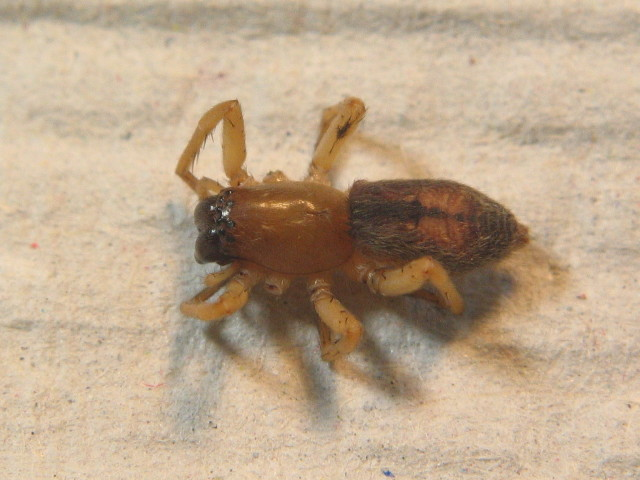

Scientific classification
- Kingdom: Animalia
- Phylum: Arthropoda
- Subphylum: Chelicerata
- Class: Arachnida
- Order: Araneae
- Infraorder: Araneomorphae
- Family: Clubionidae
- Genus: Clubiona
- Species: C. subsultans

Binomial name
- Clubiona subsultans Thorrell, 1875

Synonyms
- Clubiona ornata Thorell, 1875; Clubiona erratica Simon, 1897; Euryclubiona subsultans (Thorrell, 1875)

= Clubiona subsultans =

Species of spider

Clubiona subsultans, the Caledonian sac spider, is a spider from the family Clubionidae with a Palearctic distribution.

== Description ==
The body length of female Clubiona subsultans varies from 5–7 mm, that of males from 5–9 mm. The tibial apophysis is pointed and has 2 barbs. The prosoma is golden-brown, the chelicerae are brownish and the legs yellow. The abdomen is reddish brown with yellow spots and a black median band with white arc-lines.

== Habitat and ecology ==
Clubiona subsultans is normally found under stones and bark and in moss and litter, mostly in coniferous forests. In Britain it is called Caledonian sac-spider because the native Scots pine forest is the normal habitat. Clubiona subsultans is associated with Caledonian pine woods, where it has been found under bark, on branches, in pine litter, among young pines, and on juniper growing as an under-storey within a pine wood. Recently it was found to have been the commonest spider caught in artificial nestbox traps which were put out in Abernethy Forest to survey for the bee Osmia uncinata. Adult male and female spiders have been found in June, the males also in September.

== Distribution ==
Clubiona subsultans has a Palearctic distribution. In Europe it is found in northern and central Europe. In Great Britain this species is confined to relict patches of Caledonian Forest in north-central Scotland, giving rise to the species common name of Caledonian sac spider.

== Conservation ==
In Scotland Clubiona subsultans is threatened by the loss of Caledonian pine forest, especially through the planting of Scots pine and non-native conifers in large blocks, which is sometimes preceded by the clear-felling of the native pine. To conserve this spider the management of the forest should be aimed at conserving the pine and other native trees. The natural regeneration of Scots pine should be allowed to proceed to give the typical open forest structure of the Caledonian forest. If regeneration is too dense then early thinning of the saplings may be needed to create glades. The main site at Abernethy is now a reserve of the Royal Society for the Protection of Birds and its primary aim is to develop a self-sustaining native pine forest over the whole potential woodland area.
