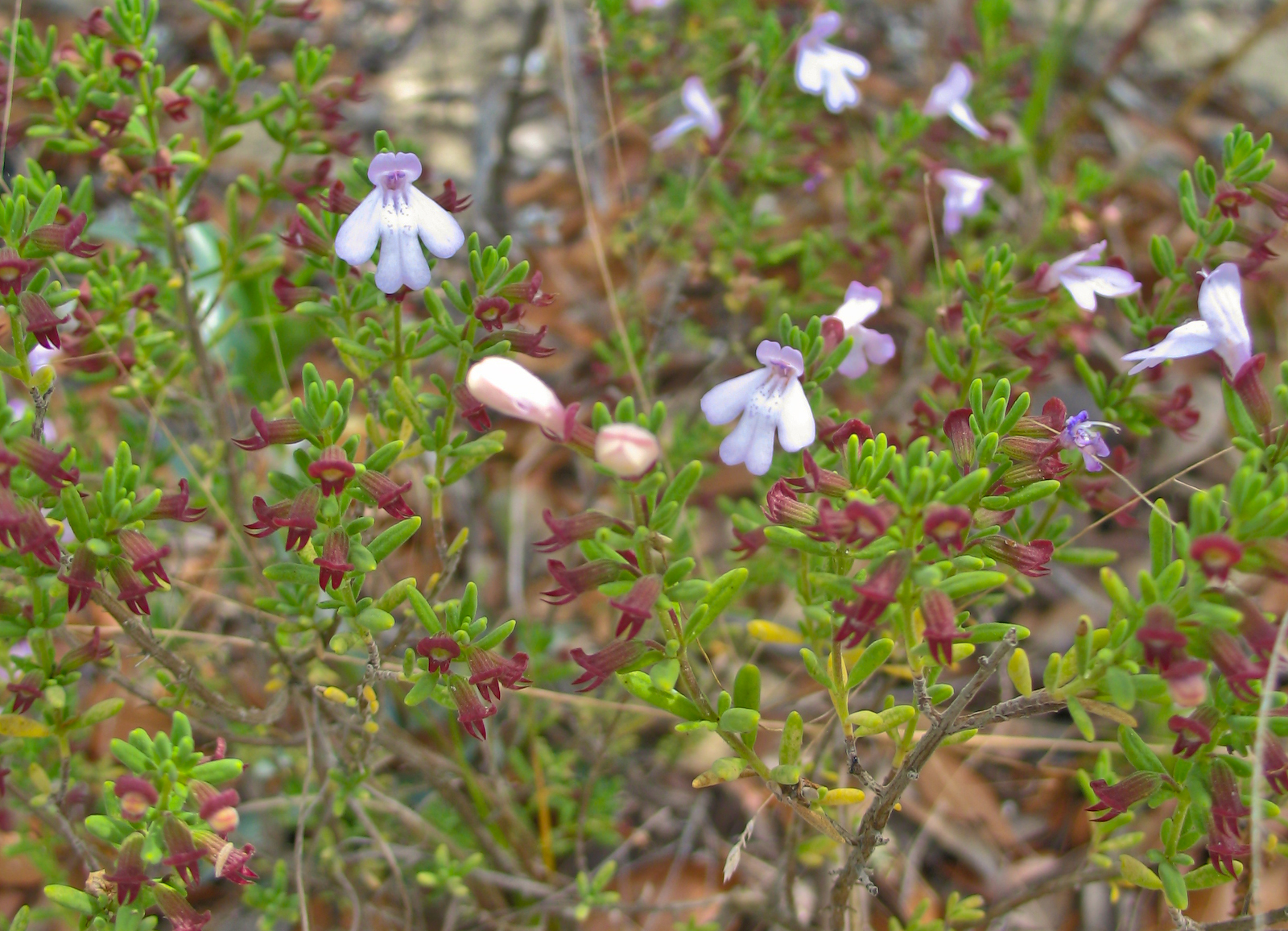

Conservation status
- Vulnerable (NatureServe)

Scientific classification
- Kingdom: Plantae
- Clade: Embryophytes
- Clade: Tracheophytes
- Clade: Angiosperms
- Clade: Eudicots
- Clade: Asterids
- Order: Lamiales
- Family: Lamiaceae
- Genus: Clinopodium
- Species: C. ashei

Binomial name
- Clinopodium ashei (Weath.) Small

Synonyms
- Calamintha ashei

= Clinopodium ashei =

Species of flowering plant

Clinopodium ashei (syn. Calamintha ashei) is a species of flowering plant in the mint family known by the common names Ashe's savory and Ashe's calamint. It is native to Florida and Georgia in the United States.

This bushy shrub grows up to about half a meter tall. It is aromatic. The stems have cracking, peeling bark and the newer twigs have a coat of downy hairs. The leaves are linear to narrowly oval in shape and are up to a centimeter long. They are hairy and glandular. The flower has a hairy, lipped corolla about a centimeter long not counting its tubular throat. It is whitish to pale lavender in color. Blooming occurs between January and April.

This plant occurs in openings in Florida scrub vegetation. It grows on sand dunes along the Ohoopee River. It can also be found in disturbed habitat such as roadsides. This plant is likely allelopathic, producing chemicals that hinder the growth of other plants nearby. There are 60 to 80 occurrences of the plant; in general it is uncommon but it can be common locally.

The plant is the primary pollen source for the rare Osmia calaminthae, the blue calamintha bee.
