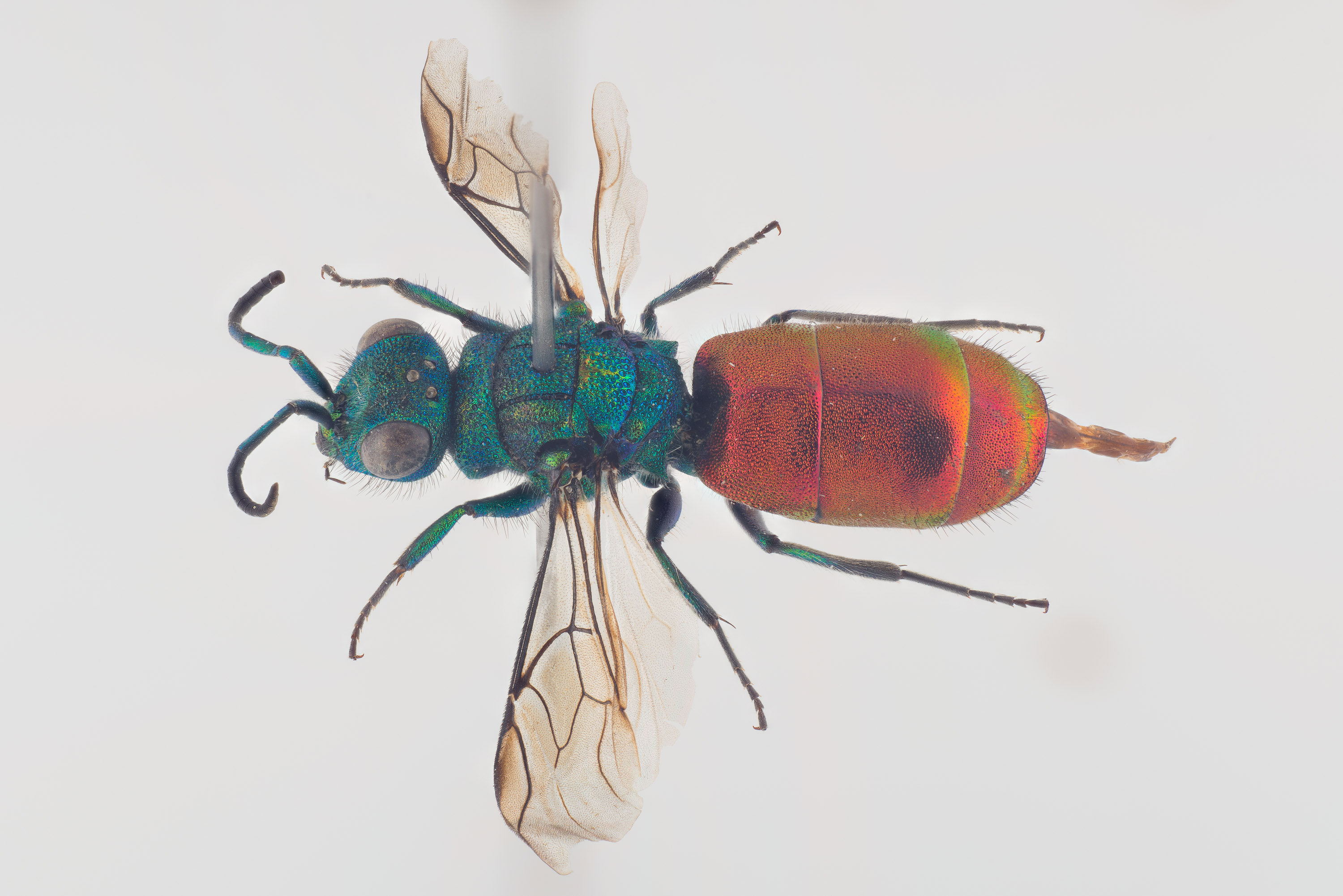

Scientific classification
- Domain: Eukaryota
- Kingdom: Animalia
- Phylum: Arthropoda
- Class: Insecta
- Order: Hymenoptera
- Family: Chrysididae
- Genus: Chrysura
- Species: C. hirsuta

Binomial name
- Chrysura hirsuta Gerstäcker,1869

= Chrysura hirsuta =

Species of insect

Chrysura hirsuta, also known as the Northern Osmia ruby-tailed wasp, is a species of parasitic cuckoo wasp within the family Chrysididae.

== Description ==
Chrysura hirsuta can range in length from 7 to 11 mm long. The head and mesosoma of the wasp are blue or dark green in colour, with a possible presence of golden green reflection. The metasoma of the wasp however is golden red or in rare circumstances golden green in colour. The mandibles possess a sizeable subapical tooth and the scutellum of the metathorax is flat. The flight period of C. hirsuta is between April and July. This species is believed to reproduce via thelytokous parthenogenesis, due to a higher female to male sex ratio.

== Distribution ==
Chrysura hirsuta can be found within the Trans-Palearctic region from Western Europe through to East Asia. The species has been recorded in the countries and territories of: Albania, Austria, Belarus, Belgium, Czech Republic, Corsica, China, Estonia, Finland, France, Germany, Greece, Hungary, Italy, Japan, Korea, Latvia, Lithuania, Norway, Sweden, Slovakia, Switzerland, Poland and the United Kingdom.

C. hirsuta has also been found living within the Pyrenees mountain range.

== Habitat ==
Chrysura hirsuta can be found living in a variety of habitats including mountains, meadows, woodlands and glades. Due to being a parasitic species, their populations can only survive in proximity to a population of their mason bee host species. C. hirsuta are often found flying in close proximity to drystone walls, rocky outcrops and dead wood, which are places their host species are known to build their nests.

=== Host species ===
The following species are known to be hosts for the Northern Osmia ruby-tailed wasp.

- Osmia inermis
- Osmia nigriventris
- Osmia parietina
- Osmia spinulosa
- Osmia uncinata
- Hoplitis tuberculata
