= Osmia zarzisa =

Scientific classification
- Domain: Eukaryota
- Kingdom: Animalia
- Phylum: Arthropoda
- Class: Insecta
- Order: Hymenoptera
- Family: Megachilidae
- Genus: Osmia
- Species: O. zarzisa

Binomial name
- Osmia zarzisa Warncke, 1992

Species of bee

Osmia zarzisa is a species of mason bee in the genus Osmia. It is native to Africa. The species is part of the honeybee family. It was first described by Warncke in 1992.
