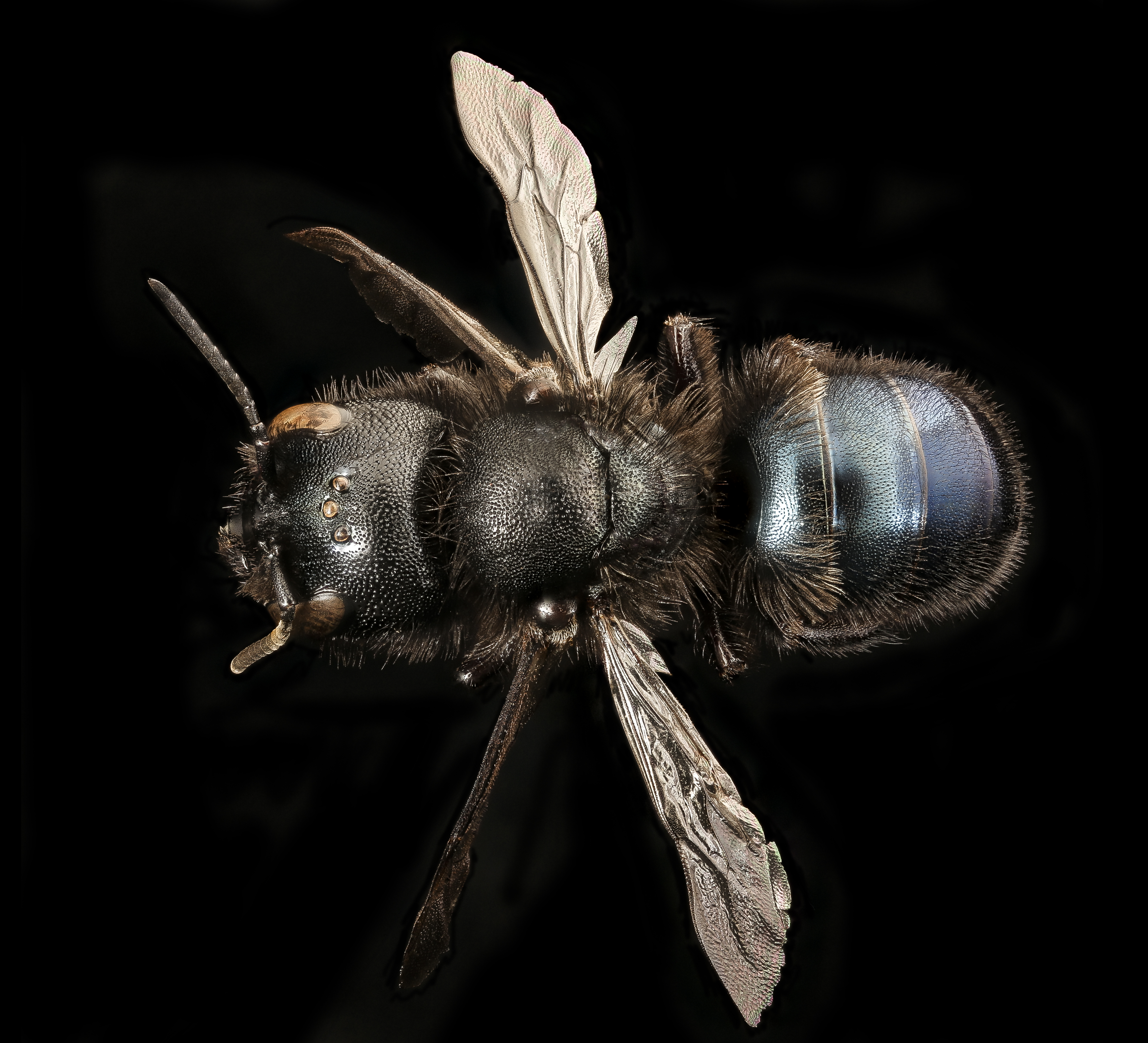

Scientific classification
- Domain: Eukaryota
- Kingdom: Animalia
- Phylum: Arthropoda
- Class: Insecta
- Order: Hymenoptera
- Family: Megachilidae
- Genus: Osmia
- Species: O. montana

Binomial name
- Osmia montana Cresson, 1864

= Osmia montana =

Species of bee

Osmia montana is a species of hymenopteran in the family Megachilidae. It is found in North America.
