= Osmia glauca =

Scientific classification
- Domain: Eukaryota
- Kingdom: Animalia
- Phylum: Arthropoda
- Class: Insecta
- Order: Hymenoptera
- Family: Megachilidae
- Genus: Osmia
- Species: O. glauca

Binomial name
- Osmia glauca (Fowler, 1899)

Species of bee

Osmia glauca is a species in the genus Osmia ("mason bees"), in the family Megachilidae ("leafcutter, mason, and resin bees, and allies"). It is found in North America.
