= Osmia agilis =

Scientific classification
- Kingdom: Animalia
- Phylum: Arthropoda
- Class: Insecta
- Order: Hymenoptera
- Family: Megachilidae
- Genus: Osmia
- Species: O. agilis

Binomial name
- Osmia agilis Morawitz, 1875

Species of bee

Osmia agilis is a species of bee in the genus Osmia and family Megachilidae. It was first described by Morawitz in 1875.
