= Osmia sanrafaelae =

Conservation status
- Apparently Secure (NatureServe)

Scientific classification
- Domain: Eukaryota
- Kingdom: Animalia
- Phylum: Arthropoda
- Class: Insecta
- Order: Hymenoptera
- Family: Megachilidae
- Genus: Osmia
- Species: O. sanrafaelae

Binomial name
- Osmia sanrafaelae Parker, 1985

Species of bee

Osmia sanrafaelae is a megachilid bee first identified in Utah's San Rafael Desert. The species' range is limited to the American intermountain West. O. sanrafaelae is a solitary nester that inhabits a wide range of ecosystems: pinyon-juniper scrubland, washes, sand dunes, and desert flatlands.

Osmia sanrafaelae measure 6–11 mm (0.24–0.43 in) in length.
