= Osmia clarescens =

Scientific classification
- Kingdom: Animalia
- Phylum: Arthropoda
- Class: Insecta
- Order: Hymenoptera
- Family: Megachilidae
- Tribe: Osmiini
- Genus: Osmia
- Species: O. clarescens

Binomial name
- Osmia clarescens Cockerell, 1911

Species of bee

Osmia clarescens is a species of bee in the family Megachilidae. It is found in Central America and North America.
