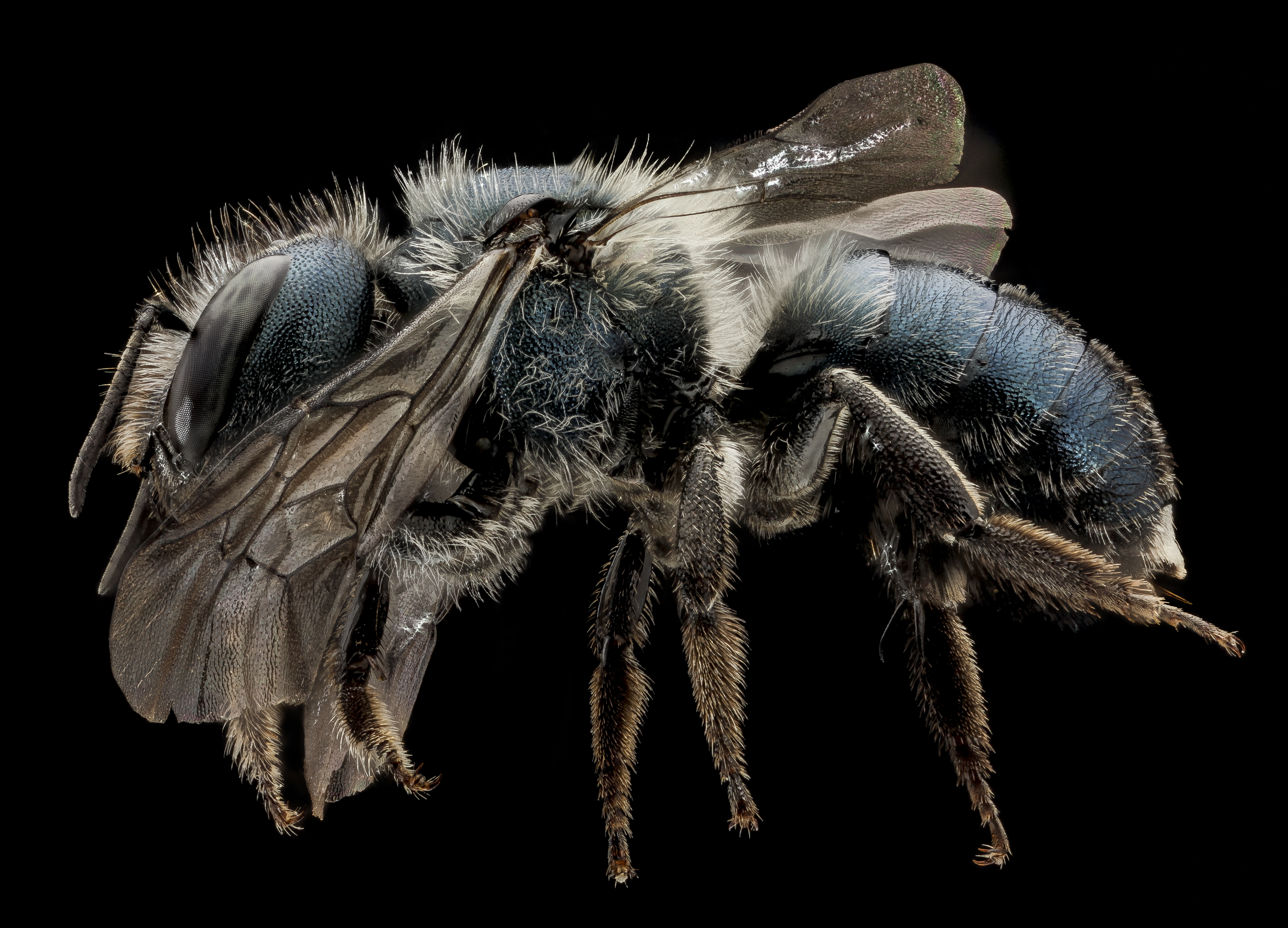

Scientific classification
- Domain: Eukaryota
- Kingdom: Animalia
- Phylum: Arthropoda
- Class: Insecta
- Order: Hymenoptera
- Family: Megachilidae
- Tribe: Osmiini
- Genus: Osmia
- Species: O. simillima

Binomial name
- Osmia simillima Smith, 1853

= Osmia simillima =

Species of bee

Osmia simillima is a species of bee in the family Megachilidae. It is found in North America. It nests in twigs, buried wood, and has also been reported to nest in oak apple galls.
