= Osmia botitena =

Scientific classification
- Kingdom: Animalia
- Phylum: Arthropoda
- Class: Insecta
- Order: Hymenoptera
- Family: Megachilidae
- Tribe: Osmiini
- Genus: Osmia
- Species: O. botitena

Binomial name
- Osmia botitena Cockerell, 1909

Species of bee

Osmia botitena is a species of bee in the family Megachilidae. It is found in North America.
