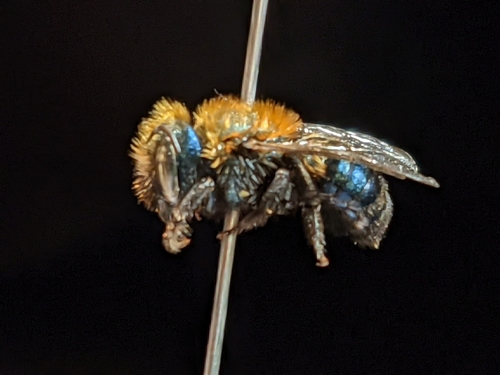
- pinned specimen identified by Jack Neff

Conservation status
- Critically Imperiled (NatureServe)

Scientific classification
- Domain: Eukaryota
- Kingdom: Animalia
- Phylum: Arthropoda
- Class: Insecta
- Order: Hymenoptera
- Family: Megachilidae
- Genus: Osmia
- Species: O. cerasi

Binomial name
- Osmia cerasi Cockerell, 1897

= Osmia cerasi =

Species of bee

Osmia cerasi is a species of mason bee found in the southwestern United States and northern Mexico.

== Description ==
Specimens are stout, with a total length averages 9.5 mm (0.37 in), with very dark metallic blue integument that can be greenish on vertex and dorsum of thorax, and purplish on clypeus. The pleura are sometimes black. Theodore Dru Alison Cockerell first described this species using specimens collected by Jessie Edna Casad and Agnes Williams Herbert. He stated that the thorax is distinctly green anteriorly, however many identified specimens do not have this green coloration, which may disappear over time or be lacking in some populations. Apical margins of the abdominal segments are dark blue, concolorous with the rest of the integument. Pubescence of pleura and face entirely black; the tegulae are black, and the ventral scopa as well as hairs on the legs are black. Pubescence of the abdomen is short and black, except for the first tergal segment, which is longer and pale fulvous. The punctures of the integument on the head and thorax are large, and about as close as it is possible for them to be where punctures covering the abdomen are also close, but not necessarily large.
