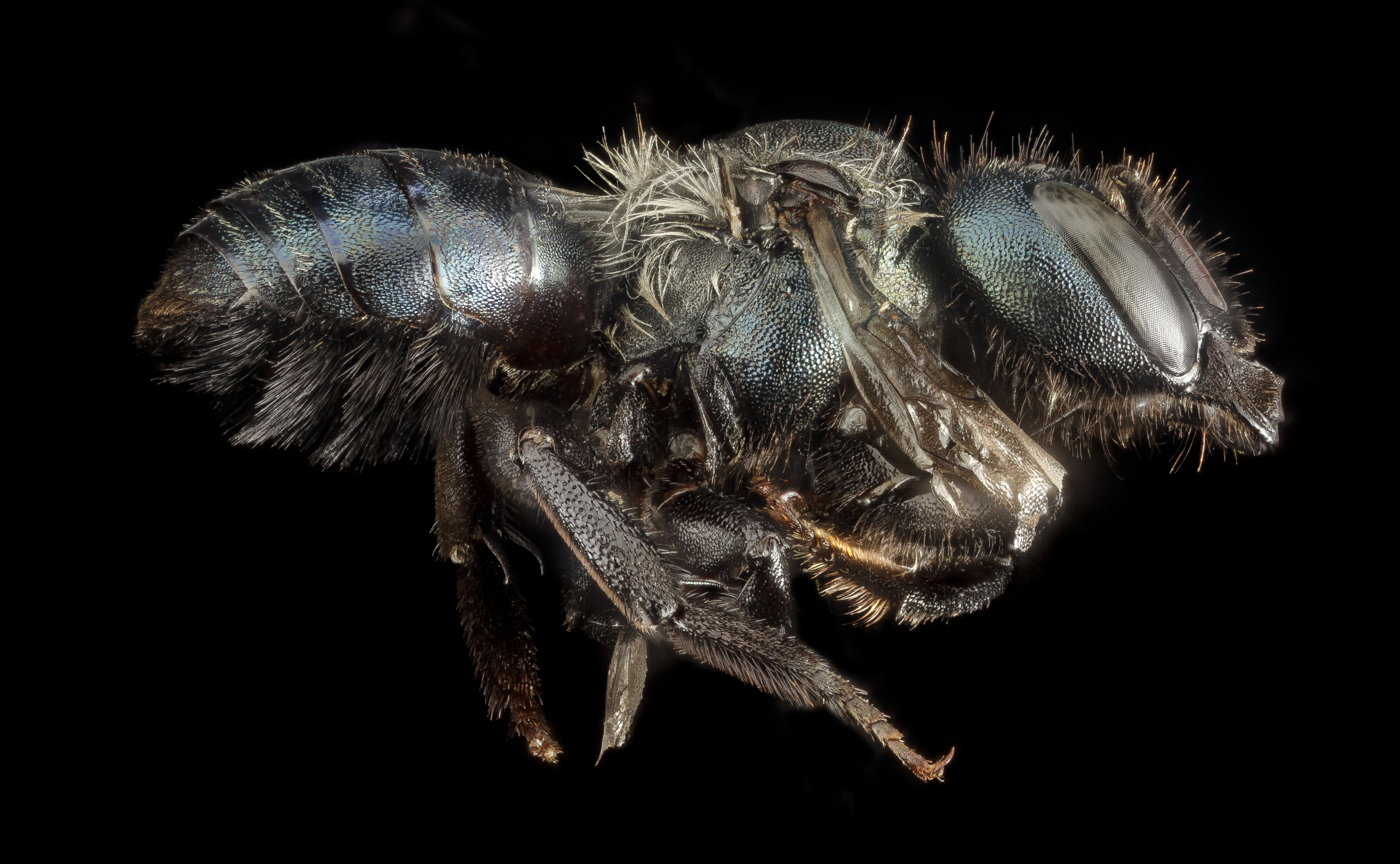

Scientific classification
- Kingdom: Animalia
- Phylum: Arthropoda
- Class: Insecta
- Order: Hymenoptera
- Family: Megachilidae
- Genus: Osmia
- Species: O. albolateralis

Binomial name
- Osmia albolateralis Cockerell, 1906

= Osmia albolateralis =

Species of bee

Osmia albolateralis is a species of bee that lives across the US, mainly in the east, but also in the Canadian provinces of British Columbia, Alberta, and Quebec it belongs to the genus Osmia and the family Megachilidae. It was described by Cockerell in 1906.
