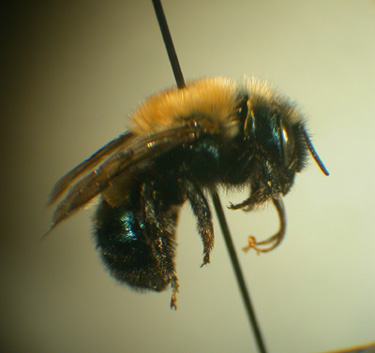

Scientific classification
- Kingdom: Animalia
- Phylum: Arthropoda
- Class: Insecta
- Order: Hymenoptera
- Family: Megachilidae
- Genus: Osmia
- Species: O. integra

Binomial name
- Osmia integra Cresson, 1878

= Osmia integra =

Species of bee

Osmia integra is a species of bee in the family Megachilidae. It is found in North America. It forms shallow nests in sand dunes.

== Subspecies ==
These two subspecies belong to the species Osmia integra:

- Osmia integra integra
- Osmia integra nigrigena
