= Osmia alfkenii =

Scientific classification
- Domain: Eukaryota
- Kingdom: Animalia
- Phylum: Arthropoda
- Class: Insecta
- Order: Hymenoptera
- Family: Megachilidae
- Genus: Osmia
- Species: O. alfkenii

Binomial name
- Osmia alfkenii Ducke, 1899

Species of bee

Osmia alfkenii is a species of bee native to the West Palearctic. Its regional distribution is in the regions of Béni Mellal-Khénifra Drâa-Tafilalet and Souss-Massa It was described by Adolpho Ducke in 1899.
