= Osmia lanei =

Conservation status
- Vulnerable (NatureServe)

Scientific classification
- Domain: Eukaryota
- Kingdom: Animalia
- Phylum: Arthropoda
- Class: Insecta
- Order: Hymenoptera
- Family: Megachilidae
- Genus: Osmia
- Species: O. lanei

Binomial name
- Osmia lanei Sandhouse, 1939

Species of mason bee

Osmia lanei is a species of bee belonging to the genus Osmia and the family Megachilidae. They are native to northern California. Like all mason bees, it is solitary and does not work in massive hives. The species was first described in 1939 by Grace A. Sandhouse.

== Nesting ==
The females generally dig underground on their own to make their nests, which can have up to 1–3 cells and are constructed solely out of masticated leaf material which bees gather and bring back to the nest.

Nesting in rocky areas very likely offers O. lanei protection from the weather, predators, cleptoparasites and allows females nesting underneath rocks to extend their foraging windows.
