= Osmia aliciae =

Scientific classification
- Domain: Eukaryota
- Kingdom: Animalia
- Phylum: Arthropoda
- Class: Insecta
- Order: Hymenoptera
- Family: Megachilidae
- Genus: Osmia
- Species: O. aliciae

Binomial name
- Osmia aliciae Ayala & Griswold, 2005

Species of bee

Osmia aliciae is a species of bee in the family Megachilidae.

== Description ==
Females of this species are distinguished from every North American mason bee except Osmia gonzalezi, by the many, prominent screw shaped hair strands on the clypeus, frons, and the vertex. Males are known by the dull, strongly granulose integument of the frons between the very close punctures.
