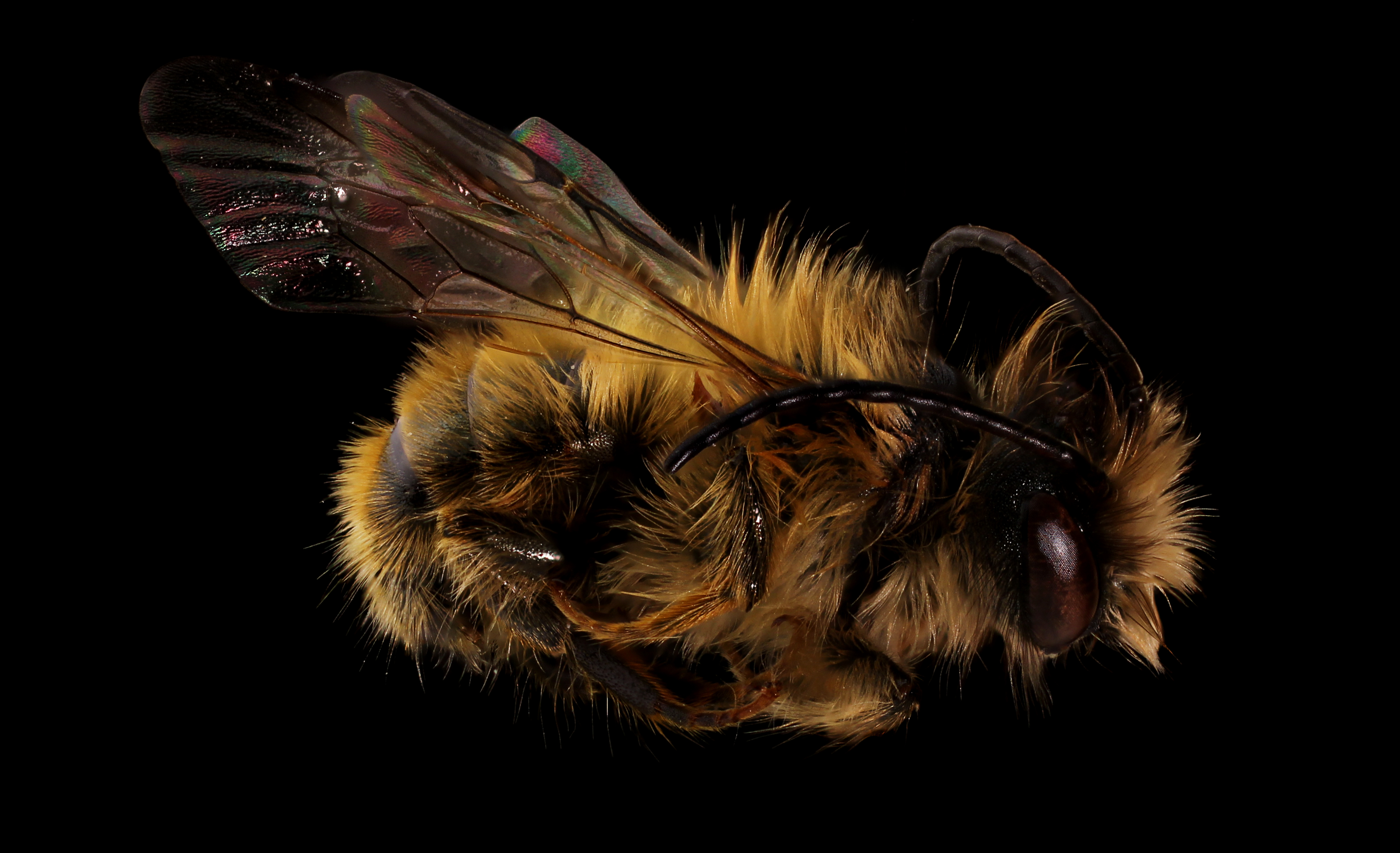

Scientific classification
- Kingdom: Animalia
- Phylum: Arthropoda
- Class: Insecta
- Order: Hymenoptera
- Family: Megachilidae
- Tribe: Osmiini
- Genus: Osmia
- Species: O. taurus

Binomial name
- Osmia taurus Smith, 1873

= Osmia taurus =

Species of bee

Osmia taurus is a species of bee in the family Megachilidae. It is found in North America and Southern Asia.
