= Osmia aquila =

Scientific classification
- Domain: Eukaryota
- Kingdom: Animalia
- Phylum: Arthropoda
- Class: Insecta
- Order: Hymenoptera
- Family: Megachilidae
- Genus: Osmia
- Species: O. aquila

Binomial name
- Osmia aquila Warncke, 1988

Species of bee

Osmia aquila is a species of bee from the Osmia genus and Megachilidae family native to Northern Asia and Europe. It was first described in 1988 by Warncke.
