= Osmia anceps =

Scientific classification
- Domain: Eukaryota
- Kingdom: Animalia
- Phylum: Arthropoda
- Class: Insecta
- Order: Hymenoptera
- Family: Megachilidae
- Genus: Osmia
- Species: O. anceps

Binomial name
- Osmia anceps Pérez 1895

Species of bee

Osmia anceps is a species of the bee clade and the genus Osmia. It is distributed across Algeria, Libya and Tunisia. It was described by Pérez in 1895.
