= Osmia aeruginosa =

Conservation status
- Data Deficient (IUCN 3.1)

Scientific classification
- Kingdom: Animalia
- Phylum: Arthropoda
- Class: Insecta
- Order: Hymenoptera
- Family: Megachilidae
- Genus: Osmia
- Species: O. aeruginosa

Binomial name
- Osmia aeruginosa Warncke, 1988

Species of bee

Osmia aeruginosa is a species of bee in the family Megachilidae and the genus Osmia. it is found in northern Fars province of iran
