= Osmia avedata =

Scientific classification
- Domain: Eukaryota
- Kingdom: Animalia
- Phylum: Arthropoda
- Class: Insecta
- Order: Hymenoptera
- Family: Megachilidae
- Genus: Osmia
- Species: O. avedata

Binomial name
- Osmia avedata Warncke, 1992

Species of bee

Osmia avedata is a species of bee in the genus Osmia and family Megachilidae. The species is found in the Levant.
