= Osmia atrorufa =

Scientific classification
- Domain: Eukaryota
- Kingdom: Animalia
- Phylum: Arthropoda
- Class: Insecta
- Order: Hymenoptera
- Family: Megachilidae
- Genus: Osmia
- Species: O. atrorufa

Binomial name
- Osmia atrorufa Friese, 1913

Species of bee

Osmia atrorufa is a species of insect from the bee clade. It is part of the Osmia genus and Megachilidae family. It's endemic to Southern Africa.
