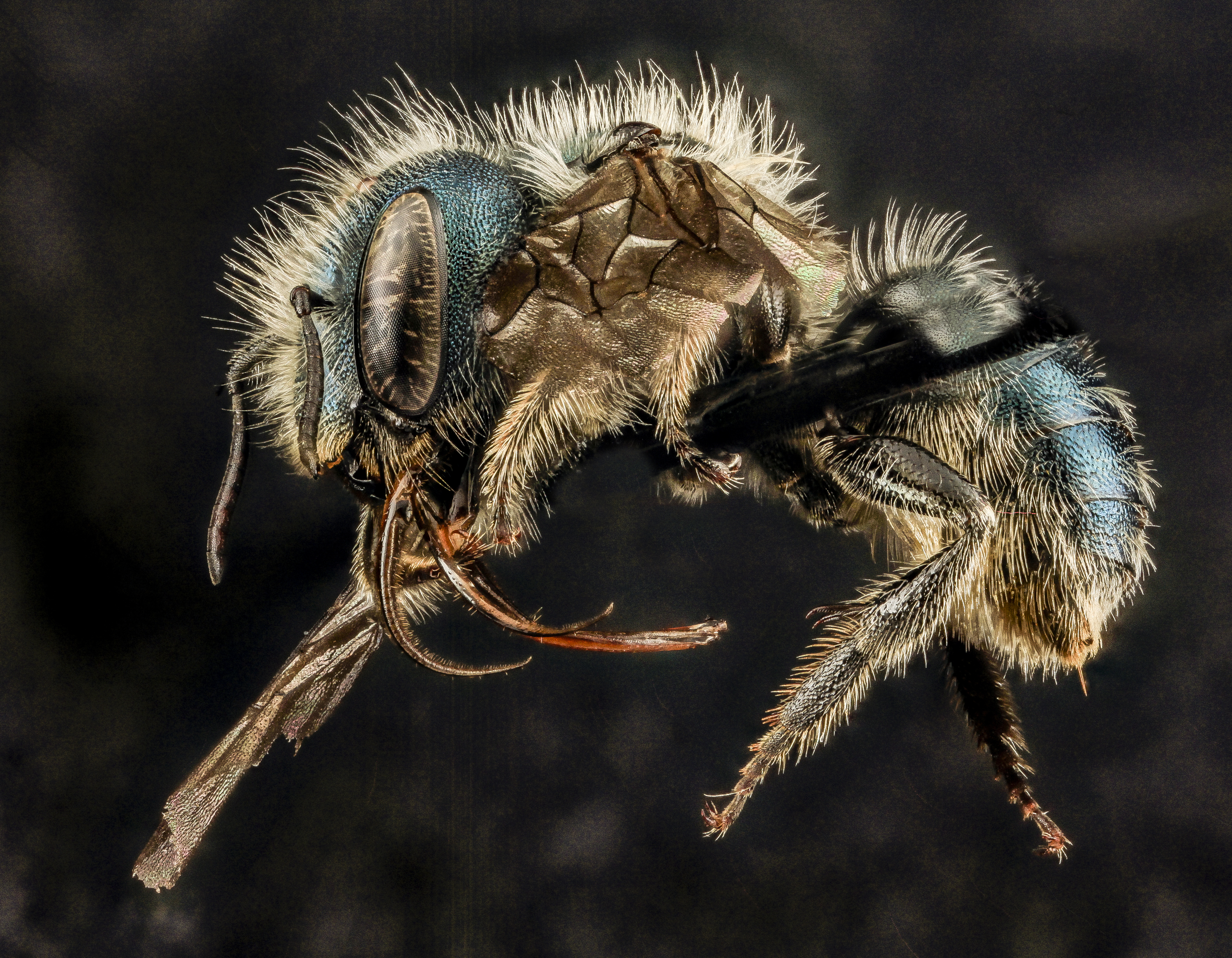

Scientific classification
- Domain: Eukaryota
- Kingdom: Animalia
- Phylum: Arthropoda
- Class: Insecta
- Order: Hymenoptera
- Family: Megachilidae
- Genus: Osmia
- Species: O. albiventris

Binomial name
- Osmia albiventris Cresson, 1864

= Osmia albiventris =

White-bellied mason bee

Species of bee

Osmia albiventris, also known as the white-bellied mason bee, is a species of bee native to Canada. It belongs to the genus Osmia and the family Megachilidae. Like most Osmia bees, it is a solitary bee.
