= Osmia ashmeadii =

Scientific classification
- Domain: Eukaryota
- Kingdom: Animalia
- Phylum: Arthropoda
- Class: Insecta
- Order: Hymenoptera
- Family: Megachilidae
- Genus: Osmia
- Species: O. ashmeadii

Binomial name
- Osmia ashmeadii (Titus, 1904)

Species of bee

Osmia ashmeadii is a species of bee of the genus Osmia. It was described in 1904 by Titus. It only occurs in Oregon, US.
