= Osmia aglaia =

Oregon berry bee

Conservation status
- Secure (NatureServe)

Scientific classification
- Domain: Eukaryota
- Kingdom: Animalia
- Phylum: Arthropoda
- Class: Insecta
- Order: Hymenoptera
- Family: Megachilidae
- Genus: Osmia
- Species: O. aglaia

Binomial name
- Osmia aglaia Sandhouse, 1939

Species of bee

Osmia aglaia, also known as the Oregon berry bee, is a species of bee of the family Megachilidae. It occurs in the Western United States, in California, Oregon, and Washington.

O. aglaia is a pollinator of brambles, including raspberries and blackberries, in western Oregon and California. They are metallic blue, green or rust/bronze in color. They nest in tunnels in wood about 1/4–3/8 inches in diameter. They are active as adults in late spring, while Rubus are in bloom.
