= Osmia cyanella =

Scientific classification
- Domain: Eukaryota
- Kingdom: Animalia
- Phylum: Arthropoda
- Class: Insecta
- Order: Hymenoptera
- Family: Megachilidae
- Tribe: Osmiini
- Genus: Osmia
- Species: O. cyanella

Binomial name
- Osmia cyanella Cockerell, 1897

Species of bee

Osmia cyanella is a species of bee in the family Megachilidae. It is found in North America.
