= Osmia atrocyanea =

Scientific classification
- Kingdom: Animalia
- Phylum: Arthropoda
- Class: Insecta
- Order: Hymenoptera
- Family: Megachilidae
- Genus: Osmia
- Species: O. atrocyanea

Binomial name
- Osmia atrocyanea Cockerell, 1897

Species of bee

Osmia atrocyanea, the large indigo mason bee, is a species of mason bee native to North America. It was scientifically described in 1897 by Cockerell.
