= Osmia ariadne =

Scientific classification
- Domain: Eukaryota
- Kingdom: Animalia
- Phylum: Arthropoda
- Class: Insecta
- Order: Hymenoptera
- Family: Megachilidae
- Genus: Osmia
- Species: O. ariadne

Binomial name
- Osmia ariadne Peters, 1978

Species of bee

Osmia ariadne is a species of mason bee of the family Megachilidae. Female specimens were used to describe the species. Its hue is black, and females measure around 11 to 12 mm (0.43 to 0.47 in). It is distributed throughout Greece and Turkey.
