= Osmia atroalba =

Scientific classification
- Domain: Eukaryota
- Kingdom: Animalia
- Phylum: Arthropoda
- Class: Insecta
- Order: Hymenoptera
- Family: Megachilidae
- Genus: Osmia
- Species: O. atroalba

Binomial name
- Osmia atroalba Morawitz, 1875

Species of bee

Osmia atroalba is a species of insect in the bee clade and the genus Osmia. It was scientifically description in 1875 by Morawitz.
