= Osmia alaiensis =

Scientific classification
- Domain: Eukaryota
- Kingdom: Animalia
- Phylum: Arthropoda
- Class: Insecta
- Order: Hymenoptera
- Family: Megachilidae
- Genus: Osmia
- Species: O. alaiensis

Binomial name
- Osmia alaiensis van der Zanden, 1994

Species of bee

Osmia alaiensis is a species of bee in the family Megachilidae. It was described by Van der Zanden in 1994.
