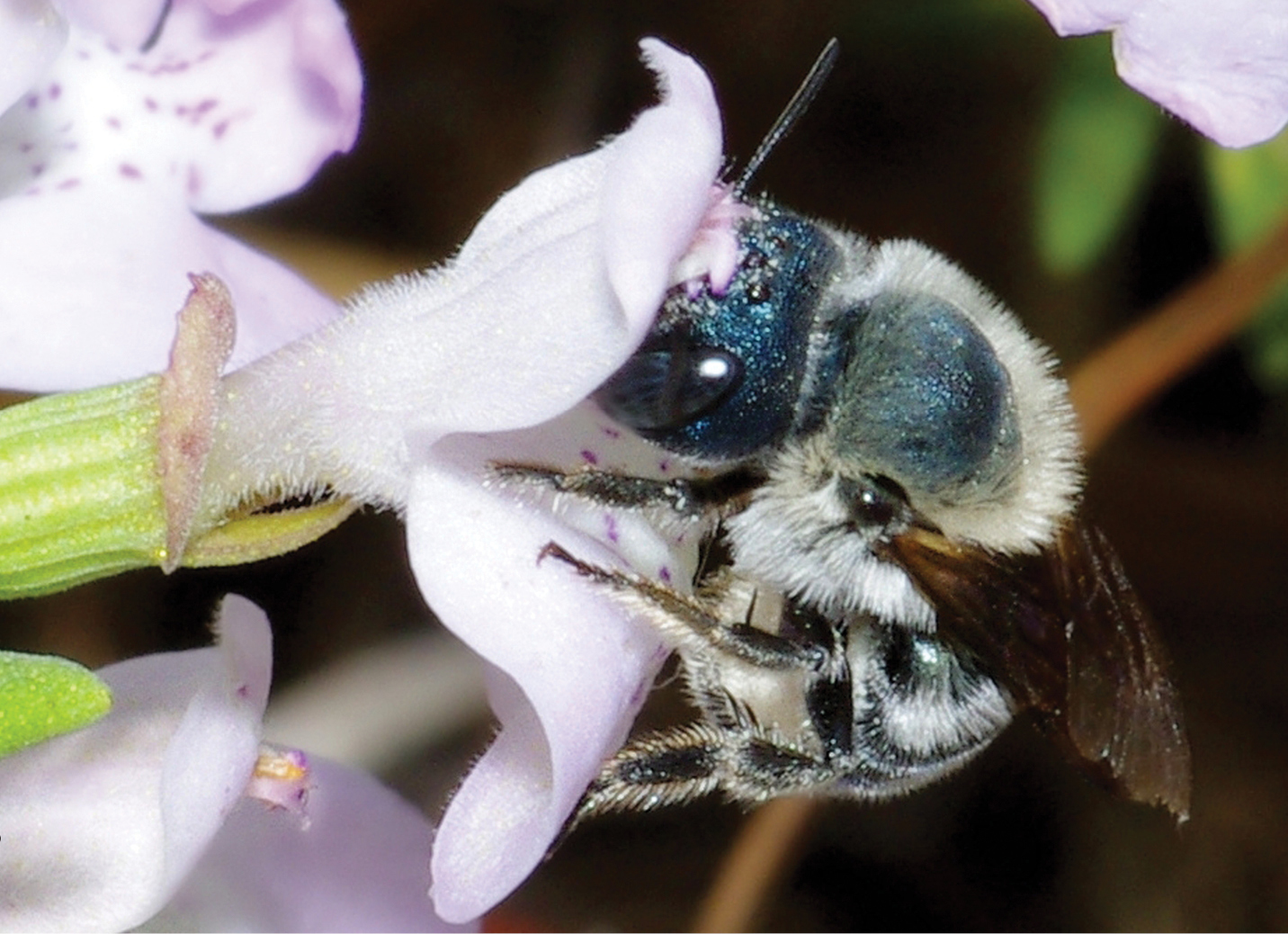
- O. calaminthae visiting Calamintha flowers

Conservation status
- Critically Imperiled (NatureServe)

Scientific classification
- Domain: Eukaryota
- Kingdom: Animalia
- Phylum: Arthropoda
- Class: Insecta
- Order: Hymenoptera
- Family: Megachilidae
- Genus: Osmia
- Species: O. calaminthae

Binomial name
- Osmia calaminthae Rightmyer, Ascher & Griswold, 2011

= Osmia calaminthae =

Rare species of bee

Osmia calaminthae, commonly known as the blue calamintha bee, is a rare species of mason bee known only from two small areas in Florida, United States. It is considered Critically Imperiled by NatureServe. The common name for the bee is derived from its distinctly blue color and its favored host plant, Calamintha ashei.

== Etymology ==
The name "calaminthae" is Latin for mint, as the presumed pollen host for the bee is Calamintha ashei, commonly known as Ashe's mint.

== Description ==
The adult female O. calaminthae ranges from 10–11 millimetres (0.39–0.43 in) in total length and has a forewing length of 6–7 millimetres (0.24–0.28 in). The male is 10 millimetres (0.39 in) in length with a 6 millimetres (0.24 in) long forewing. The female is dark blue in color with some brown integument; the male has a pale blue head and mesosoma, dark blue metasoma, and some brown integument. The females, along with females of Osmia conjunctoides, are unique among North American Osmia (mason bees) for their short, erect, simple facial hairs utilized for pollen collection.

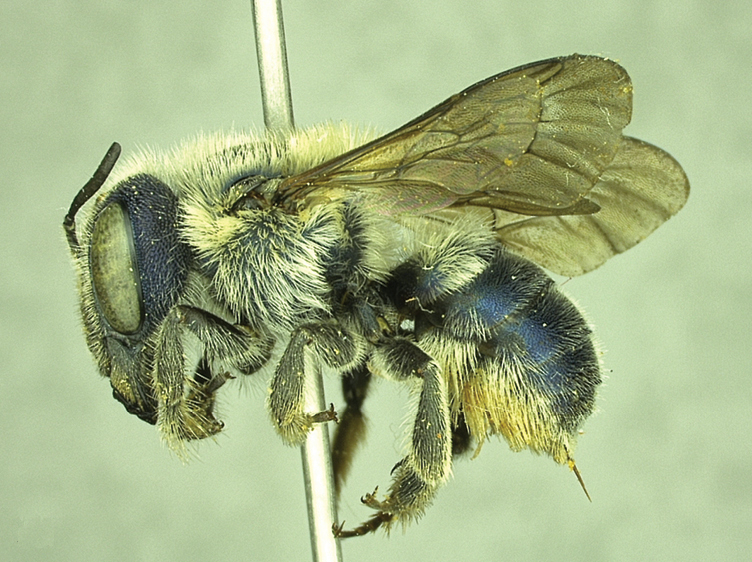
Female

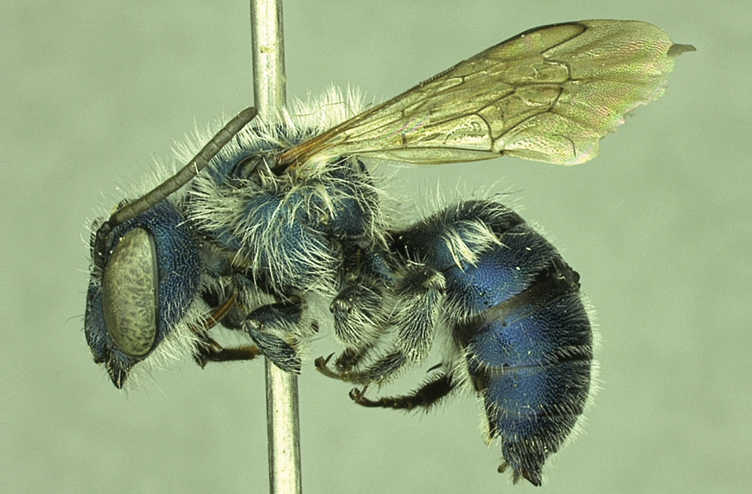
Male

== Distribution and ecology ==
Osmia calaminthae has only been observed at eleven sites, primarily within a 20 kilometres (12 mi) long, 2 kilometres (1.2 mi) wide area of sandy Florida scrub located in southern Lake Wales Ridge in Highlands County, Florida, and in Ocala National Forest in Marion County, Florida. The majority of observations are from various undeveloped lots in Lake Placid. This makes it possibly among the most geographically limited and host-specific bees in eastern North America. While it is possible that the bee ranges further than has been observed, there has never been an attempt to comprehensively survey bees in Florida or document their hosts. The area of observation is also known for endemism. Florida scrub is a unique form of shrub environment located on ridges and knolls of wind-deposited sand. The bee depends primarily on Calamintha ashei and Conradina brevifolia as pollen sources. Individual C. ashei are known to live as long as a decade and are suspected to live longer. They bloom primarily in mid-March through mid-April. Since as few as 20 to 30 mature plants can present thousands of flowers, the species serves as a reliable annual food source for O. calaminthae. C. brevifolia, which is more rare than C. ashei, blooms earlier than C. ashei. It was discovered in 2020 that the bee nests in the ground. Nests have been found in both the Lake Wales Ridge and the Ocala National Forest.

== Conservation status ==
Osmia calaminthae is very poorly known and its conservation status is not currently documented by the United States Fish and Wildlife Service. It is listed as a "species of greatest conservation need" by the Florida State Wildlife Action Plan, and as of 2019 it has been listed as Critically Imperiled by NatureServe. In 2015, a petition was filed to the US Fish and Wildlife Service to evaluate the conservation status for the bee, and its status is now under review. The bee was described in 2011, and its habitat studied in 2016, but its continued existence was unknown until it was rediscovered in March 2020. Most of the known habitat for the bee is not protected and is subject to development. Pesticide drift and all-terrain vehicles are additional threats.
