= Osmia angustipes =

Scientific classification
- Domain: Eukaryota
- Kingdom: Animalia
- Phylum: Arthropoda
- Class: Insecta
- Order: Hymenoptera
- Family: Megachilidae
- Genus: Osmia
- Species: O. angustipes

Binomial name
- Osmia angustipes Cockerell, 1933

Species of bee

Osmia angustipes is a species of mason bee from the family Megachilidae. It is found in North America and was discovered in 1933 by Cockerell.
