= Osmia alticola =

Scientific classification
- Domain: Eukaryota
- Kingdom: Animalia
- Phylum: Arthropoda
- Class: Insecta
- Order: Hymenoptera
- Family: Megachilidae
- Genus: Osmia
- Species: O. alticola

Binomial name
- Osmia alticola Benoist 1922

Species of bee

Osmia alticola is a species of bee of the genus Osmia and the family Megachilidae. It lives around Liguria, Piedmont, the Italian Alps and the Austrian Alps. It was observed by Raymond Benoist in 1922.
