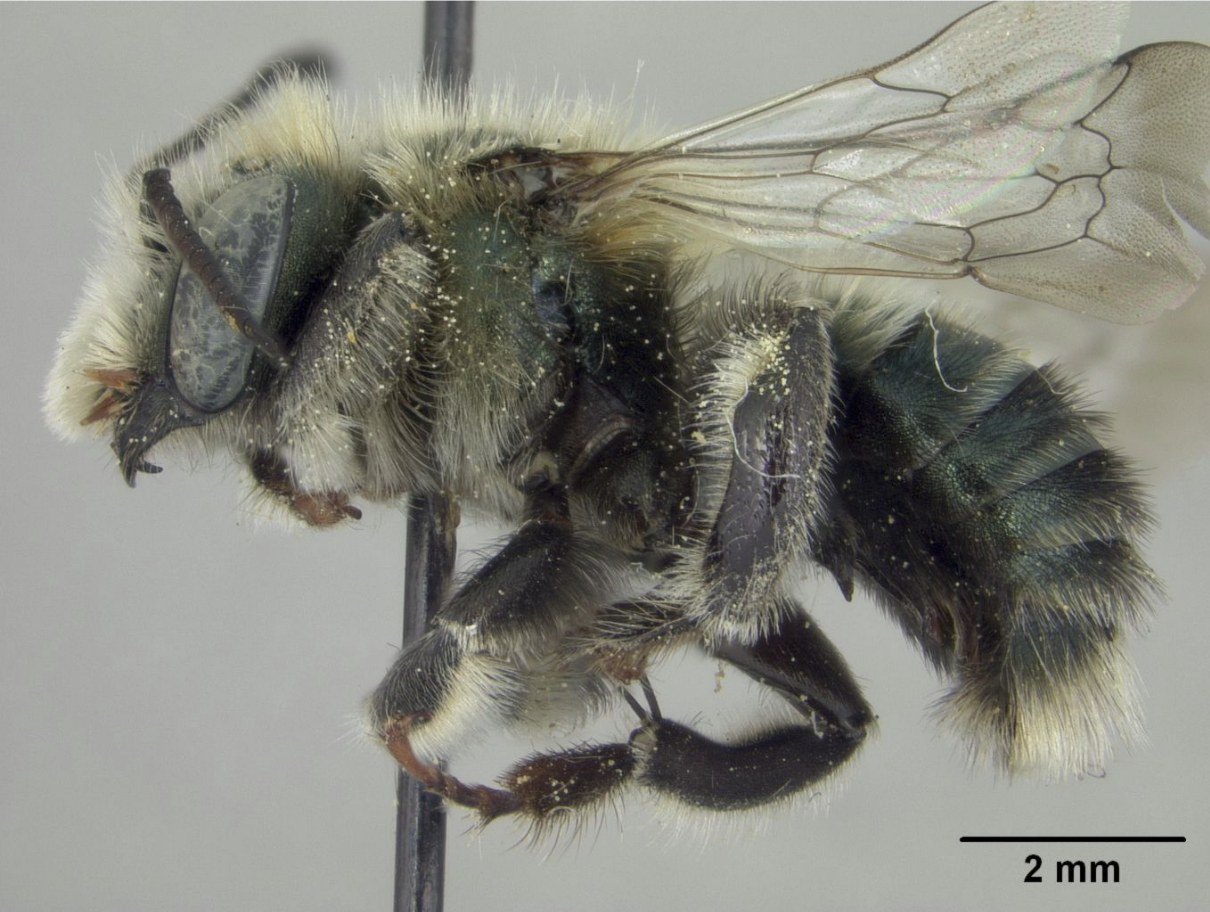
- Type specimen

Scientific classification
- Domain: Eukaryota
- Kingdom: Animalia
- Phylum: Arthropoda
- Class: Insecta
- Order: Hymenoptera
- Family: Megachilidae
- Genus: Osmia
- Species: O. alpestris

Binomial name
- Osmia alpestris Rust & Bohart, 1986

= Osmia alpestris =

Species of insect

Osmia alpestris is a species of bee within the genus Osmia, also known as mason bees, that lives within the US states of Utah, Nevada, Wyoming, and Arizona.
