= Osmia amathusica =

Scientific classification
- Domain: Eukaryota
- Kingdom: Animalia
- Phylum: Arthropoda
- Class: Insecta
- Order: Hymenoptera
- Family: Megachilidae
- Genus: Osmia
- Species: O. amathusica

Binomial name
- Osmia amathusica Mavromoustakis, 1937

Species of bee

Osmia amathusica is a species of bee in the genus Osmia and family Megachilidae. It is found in Lebanon, Israel, and The Sinai Peninsula. It was first observed in 1935.
