= Osmia ausica =

Scientific classification
- Kingdom: Animalia
- Phylum: Arthropoda
- Class: Insecta
- Order: Hymenoptera
- Family: Megachilidae
- Genus: Osmia
- Species: O. ausica

Binomial name
- Osmia ausica Cockerell, 1944

Species of bee

Osmia ausica is a species of bee from the Osmia genus native to Southern Africa. It was scientifically described in 1944.
