= Osmia austromaritima =

Scientific classification
- Domain: Eukaryota
- Kingdom: Animalia
- Phylum: Arthropoda
- Class: Insecta
- Order: Hymenoptera
- Family: Megachilidae
- Genus: Osmia
- Species: O. austromaritima

Binomial name
- Osmia austromaritima Michener, 1936

Species of bee

Osmia austromaritima is a species of bee of the genus Osmia and family Megachilidae, It lives in North Arizona, Utah, West Colorado and California.
