= Osmia argyropyga =

Scientific classification
- Domain: Eukaryota
- Kingdom: Animalia
- Phylum: Arthropoda
- Class: Insecta
- Order: Hymenoptera
- Family: Megachilidae
- Genus: Osmia
- Species: O. argyropyga

Binomial name
- Osmia argyropyga Pérez, 1879

Species of bee

Osmia argyropyga is a species of mason bee native to Africa, Europe and Asia. It was described by Pérez in 1879.
