= Osmia dakotensis =

Scientific classification
- Domain: Eukaryota
- Kingdom: Animalia
- Phylum: Arthropoda
- Class: Insecta
- Order: Hymenoptera
- Family: Megachilidae
- Tribe: Osmiini
- Genus: Osmia
- Species: O. dakotensis

Binomial name
- Osmia dakotensis Michener, 1937

Species of bee

Osmia dakotensis is a species of bee in the family Megachilidae. It is found in North America.
