= Osmia adae =

Scientific classification
- Domain: Eukaryota
- Kingdom: Animalia
- Phylum: Arthropoda
- Class: Insecta
- Order: Hymenoptera
- Family: Megachilidae
- Genus: Osmia
- Species: O. adae

Binomial name
- Osmia adae Bingham, 1897

Species of Mason bee

Osmia adae is a species of bees within the genus Osmia, also known as mason bees, in the Megachilidae family.

It was described by British entomologist Charles Thomas Bingham in 1897.

Osmia adae are largely found in Northern India.
