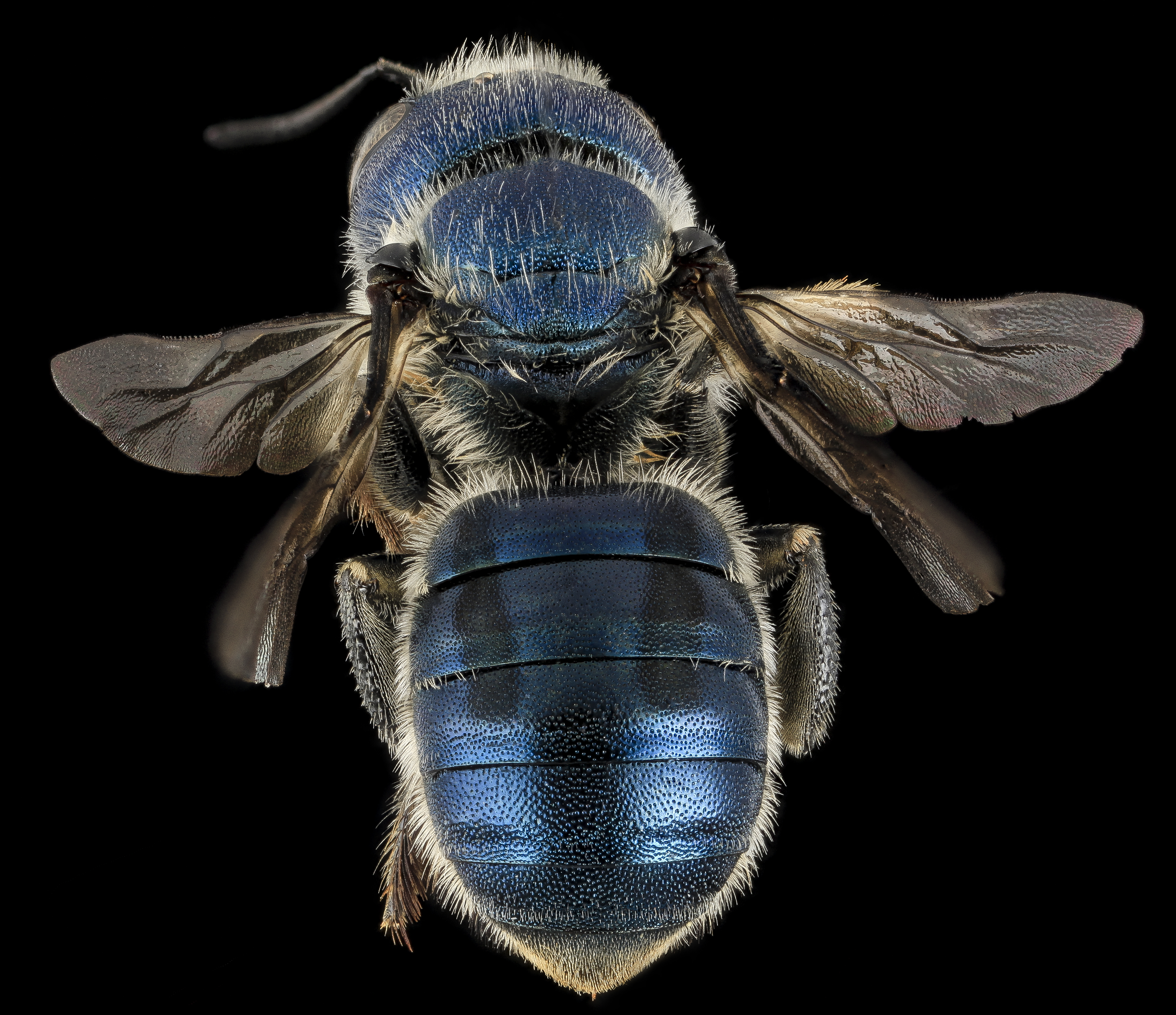

Scientific classification
- Domain: Eukaryota
- Kingdom: Animalia
- Phylum: Arthropoda
- Class: Insecta
- Order: Hymenoptera
- Family: Megachilidae
- Genus: Osmia
- Species: O. texana

Binomial name
- Osmia texana Cresson, 1872

= Osmia texana =

Species of bee

Osmia texana, the Texas osmia, is a species of bee in the family Megachilidae. It is found in Central America and North America.

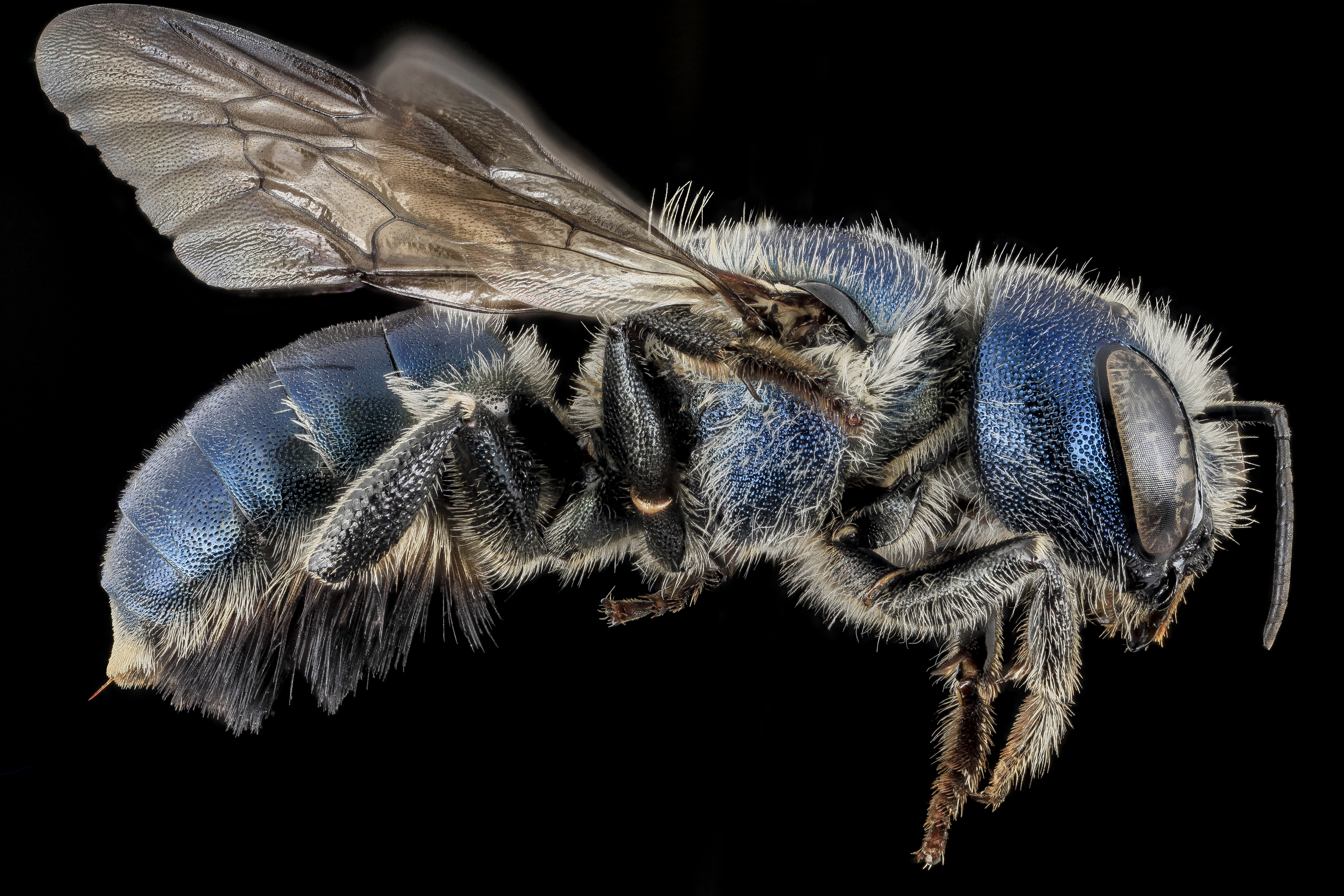
Texas osmia, Osmia texana
