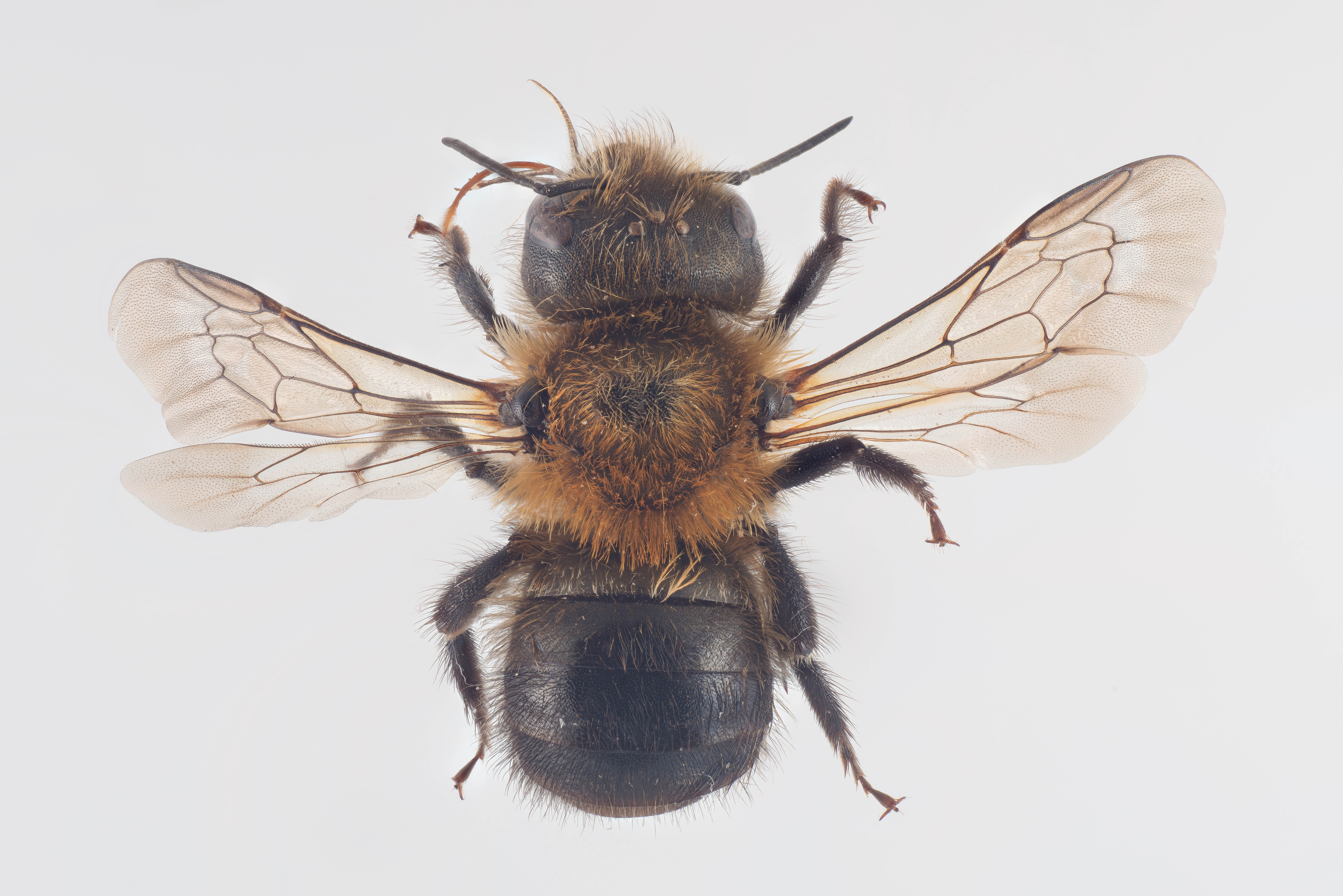

Conservation status
- Secure (NatureServe)

Scientific classification
- Domain: Eukaryota
- Kingdom: Animalia
- Phylum: Arthropoda
- Class: Insecta
- Order: Hymenoptera
- Family: Megachilidae
- Genus: Osmia
- Species: O. nigriventris

Binomial name
- Osmia nigriventris (Zetterstedt, 1838)

Synonyms
- Anthophora nigriventris Zetterstedt, 1838; Osmia baicalensis Radoszkowski, 1867; Osmia corticalis Gerstäcker, 1869; Osmia hudsonica Cresson, 1864; Osmia frigida Smith, 1853

= Osmia nigriventris =

Species of bee

Osmia nigriventris, also known as the large black-bellied mason bee, is a species of solitary bee within the family Megachilidae.

== Description ==
The exoskeleton of Osmia nigriventris is entirely black with no metallic reflections. The bees body length can range from 10 - 14 mm long. Females possess a strongly thickened clypeal margin and lightly infuscated wings. Males however possess reflexed apicolateral angles of the 5th and 6th tergal segments and subhyaline wings. Both male and female bees have whitish-pale pubescence over the head, thorax and clypeus.

=== Reproduction ===
Females of Osmia nigriventris will use their specialized mandibles to excavate nests in wooden substrate such as the thick tree bark of Larix or Pinus species. Suitable nest sites can include either tree bark that is lying on the ground or attached to the remains of standing deadwood, tree stumps and coarse woody debris. Nests will contain from 1 - 26 brood cells, which are constructed within one or several tunnels built by the females. Brood cells are linearly arranged and separated from one another by three-layered partitions made from leaf pulp. The leaf pulp is created from chewed up leaves from genus such as Potentilla and Helianthemum. Pollen provisions are stored in brood cells to provide the offspring with a food source during development.

Depending on the altitude of the nest, adult bees can emerge from the beginning of May to the first decade of June. It is believed that O. nigriventris requires two years to reach maturity in subalpine zones and that the species overwinters as a prepupa during its first winter.

== Distribution ==
Osmia nigriventris has a large distribution and is known to live in both the Neartic and Paleartic zones. It can be found living in North America, where it is present in the states of Oregon, Idaho, Wyoming, Michigan and Minnesota. The species is also present in Canada where it can be found in the territories of Yukon, Ontario, Quebec and Newfoundland. In Europe populations are present in Austria, Czech Republic, Finland, France, Germany, Italy, Lithuania, Poland, Slovakia, Switzerland and European Russia. In Asia the bees range extends through Mongolia, Northern China and Russia to far eastern Siberia.

== Habitat and ecology ==
Osmia nigriventris can be found living in open forest, forest edges and meadow habitats in subalpine locations. Females will build their nests in wooden substrate such as the bark of Larix or Pinus trees. Nest sites can include ground resting tree bark or bark attached to the remains of standing deadwood, tree stumps and coarse woody debris. The bee has a preference for flowers from the families Fabaceae (Lotus), Ericaceae (Rhododendron and Vaccinium) and Cistaceae (Helianthemum). Populations have been recorded up to 2250 meters above sea level.

=== Parasites ===
The following species are known to be brood parasites of Osmia nigriventris:

- Anthrax anthrax - Anthracite bee-fly
- Chrysura hirsuta - Northern Osmia ruby-tailed wasp
- Sapyga similis
