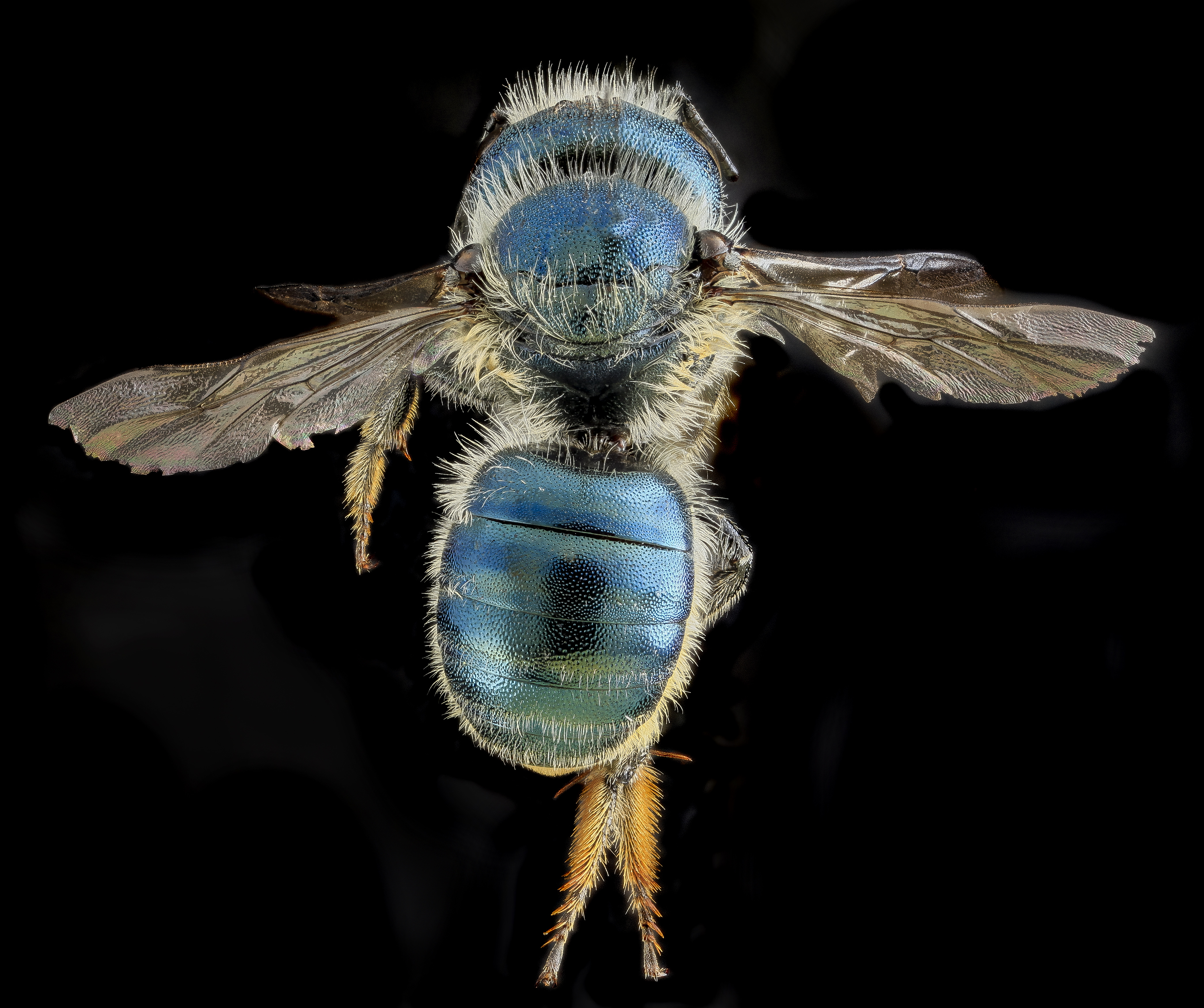

Scientific classification
- Domain: Eukaryota
- Kingdom: Animalia
- Phylum: Arthropoda
- Class: Insecta
- Order: Hymenoptera
- Family: Megachilidae
- Genus: Osmia
- Species: O. georgica

Binomial name
- Osmia georgica Cresson, 1878

= Osmia georgica =

Species of bee

Osmia georgica is a species of bee in the family Megachilidae. It is found in Central America and North America.
