= Osmia coloradensis =

Scientific classification
- Kingdom: Animalia
- Phylum: Arthropoda
- Clade: Pancrustacea
- Class: Insecta
- Order: Hymenoptera
- Family: Megachilidae
- Genus: Osmia
- Species: O. coloradensis

Binomial name
- Osmia coloradensis Cresson, 1878

Species of bee

Osmia coloradensis

Osmia coloradensis, the Colorado osmia, is a species of bee in the family Megachilidae. It is found in Central America and North America.
