= Osmia apicata =

Scientific classification
- Domain: Eukaryota
- Kingdom: Animalia
- Phylum: Arthropoda
- Class: Insecta
- Order: Hymenoptera
- Family: Megachilidae
- Genus: Osmia
- Species: O. apicata

Binomial name
- Osmia apicata Smith, 1853

Species of bee

Osmia apicata is a species of insect from the family Megachilidae and the Osmia genus. It is black in color and they feed on nectar in an upside down position. Lengths are 10.5 to 12 mm (0.41 to 0.47 in) in males and 12 to 12.5 mm (0.47 to 0.49 in). On record, adults of these species fly from April to June. They breed in crevices and holes in rocks. It is native to Greece, Slovenia, Turkey, Italy and Israel.
