= Osmia zephyros =

Conservation status
- Imperiled (NatureServe)

Scientific classification
- Kingdom: Animalia
- Phylum: Arthropoda
- Class: Insecta
- Order: Hymenoptera
- Family: Megachilidae
- Genus: Osmia
- Species: O. zephyros

Binomial name
- Osmia zephyros Sandhouse, 1939

Species of bee

Osmia zephyros is a species of solitary bee in the family Megachilidae endemic to North America. It was first described in 1939 by Grace Sandhouse.
