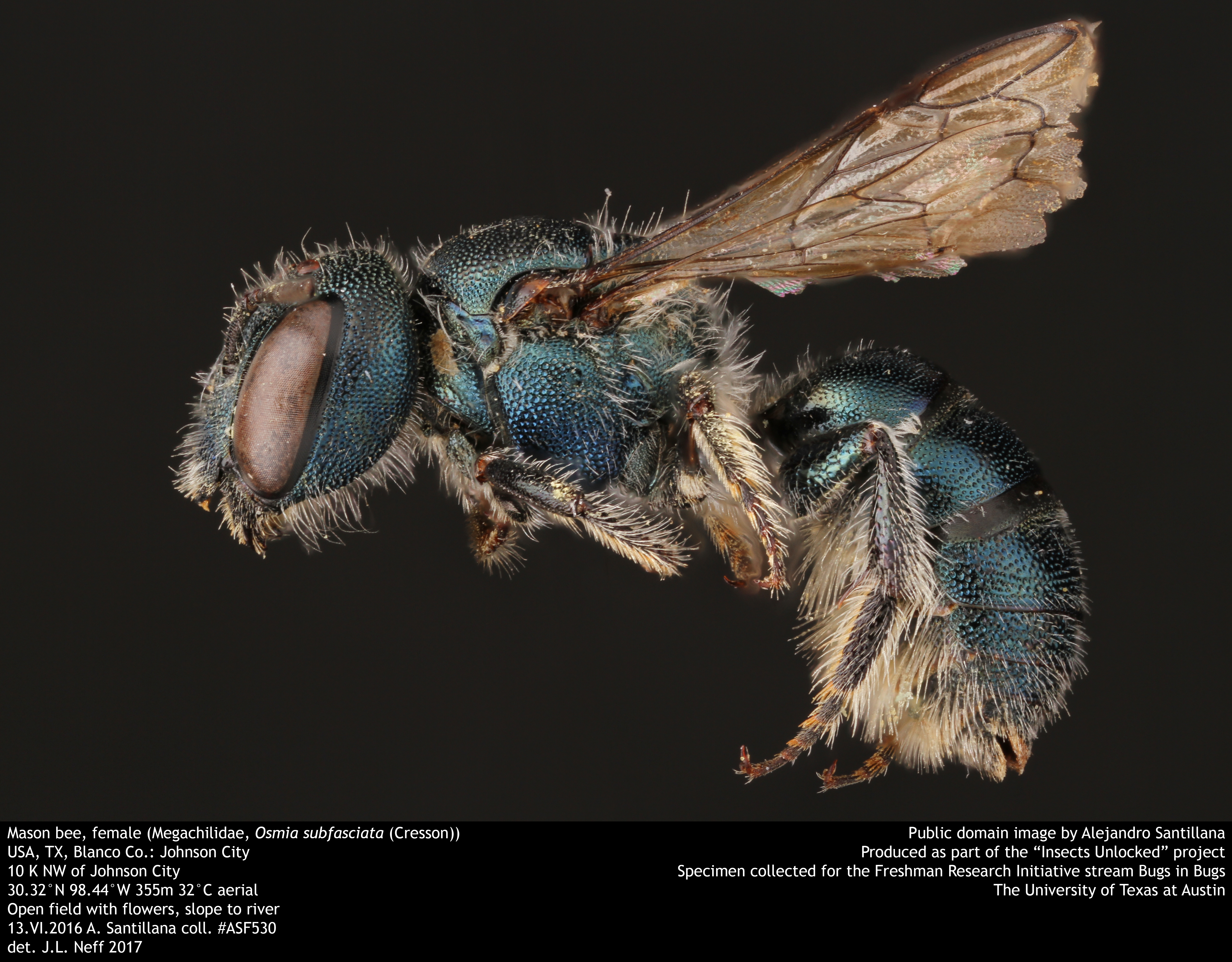

Scientific classification
- Domain: Eukaryota
- Kingdom: Animalia
- Phylum: Arthropoda
- Class: Insecta
- Order: Hymenoptera
- Family: Megachilidae
- Genus: Osmia
- Species: O. subfasciata

Binomial name
- Osmia subfasciata Cresson, 1872

= Osmia subfasciata =

Species of bee

Osmia subfasciata is a species of bee in the family Megachilidae. It is found in Central America and North America.

== Subspecies ==
These two subspecies belong to the species Osmia subfasciata:

- Osmia subfasciata miamiensis Mitchell
- Osmia subfasciata subfasciata
