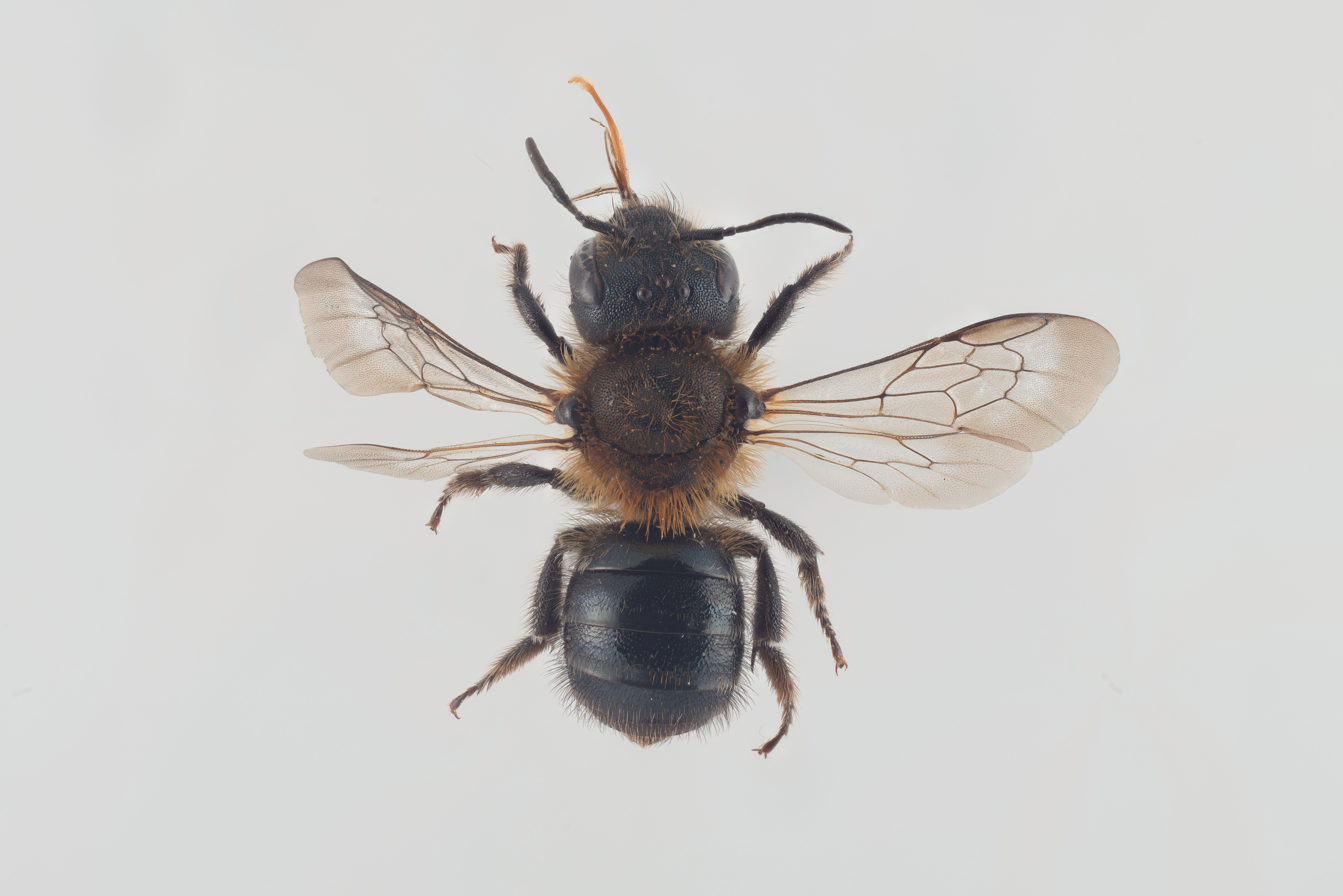

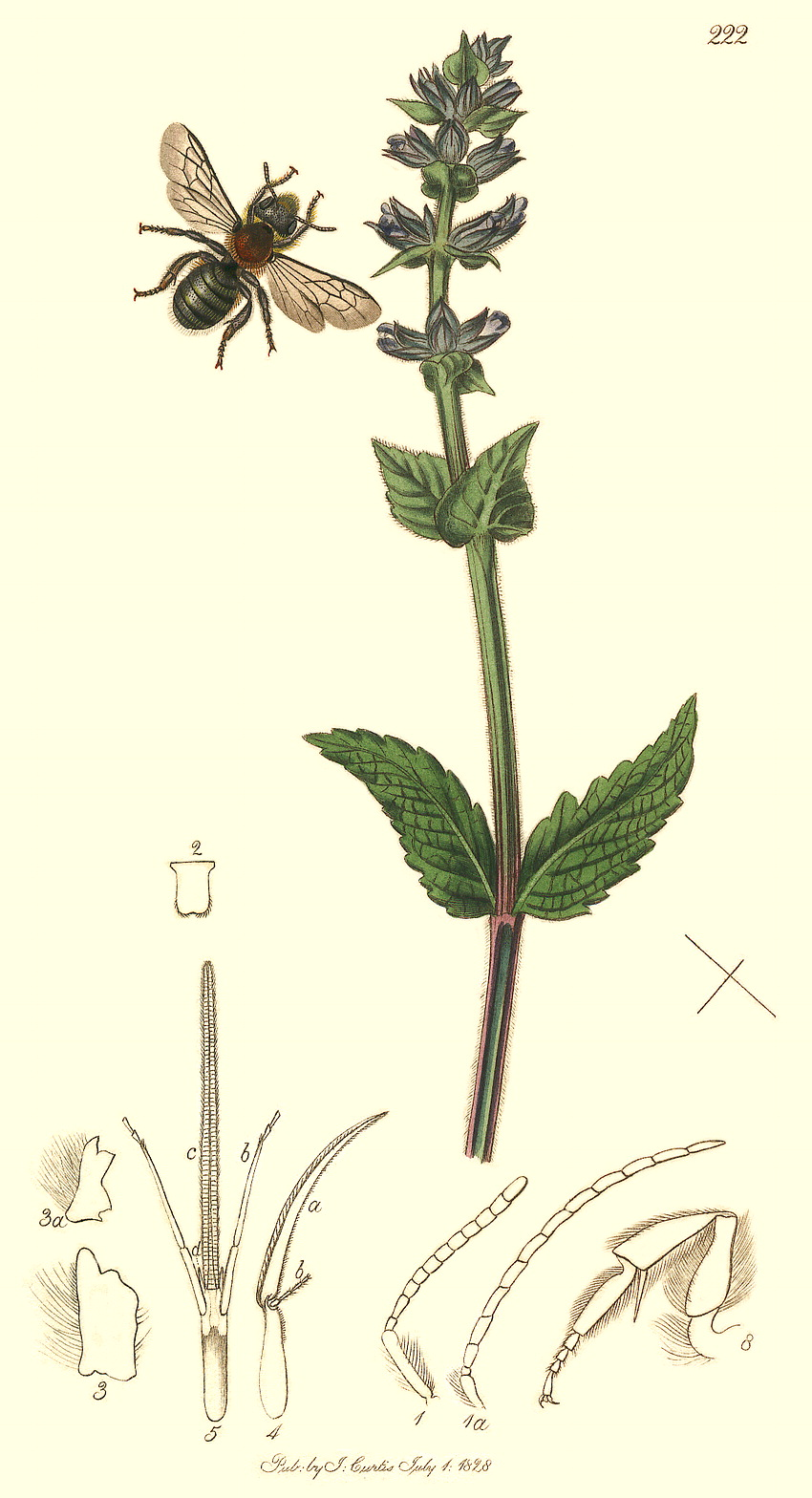

Scientific classification
- Domain: Eukaryota
- Kingdom: Animalia
- Phylum: Arthropoda
- Class: Insecta
- Order: Hymenoptera
- Family: Megachilidae
- Genus: Osmia
- Species: O. parietina

Binomial name
- Osmia parietina Curtis, 1828

= Osmia parietina =

Species of bee

Osmia parietina, also known as the Western mason bee or wall mason bee, is a species of solitary bee within the family Megachilidae.

== Description ==
Osmia parietina is mostly black in colour, however possesses ginger pubescence on top of the abdomen. They are a medium sized bee, which can be found in flight between the months of May and July.

== Distribution and habitat ==
Osmia parietina can be found across Europe, however is mostly restricted to upland, hilly and mountainous areas. It has been recorded throughout much of Northern Eurasia including the United Kingdom, Spain, Greece and Russia.

Osmia parietina is associated with areas of unimproved grassland, where their primary nectar source bird's foot trefoil (Lotus corniculatus) grows. They also have a preference for upland herb rich pastures and woodland glades. Females build their nests inside the crevices of drystone walls, rock faces and standing deadwood.

== Ecology ==
Although L. corniculatus is the primary nectar source for Osmia parietina, it has been recorded visiting flowers of other plant species such as: Ajuga reptans, Hippocrepis comosa, Rubus fruticosus, Sedum reflexum, Trifolium pratense and Veronica chamaedrys.

The Western mason bee is also one of several host species for the parasitic Northern Osmia ruby-tailed wasp (Chrysura hirsuta).

== Threats ==
The overgrazing of meadows where bird's-foot trefoil grow means that the plant cannot successfully flower, this harms the Osmia parietina population as bird's-foot trefoil is their primary source of nectar. Poor management of woodland habitats can also cause their population to decline. Sunny glades and woodland clearings are essential habitats for wildflowers, if these clearings are not maintained the wildflowers are eventually shaded out by shrubs and trees, which accelerates the decline of O. parietina. The loss of sunny rock habitats for the bees to nest in due to shrub encroachment also threatens the species. Human activity such as the manual removal of drystone walls and standing deadwood also removes essential sites for nests to be built.
