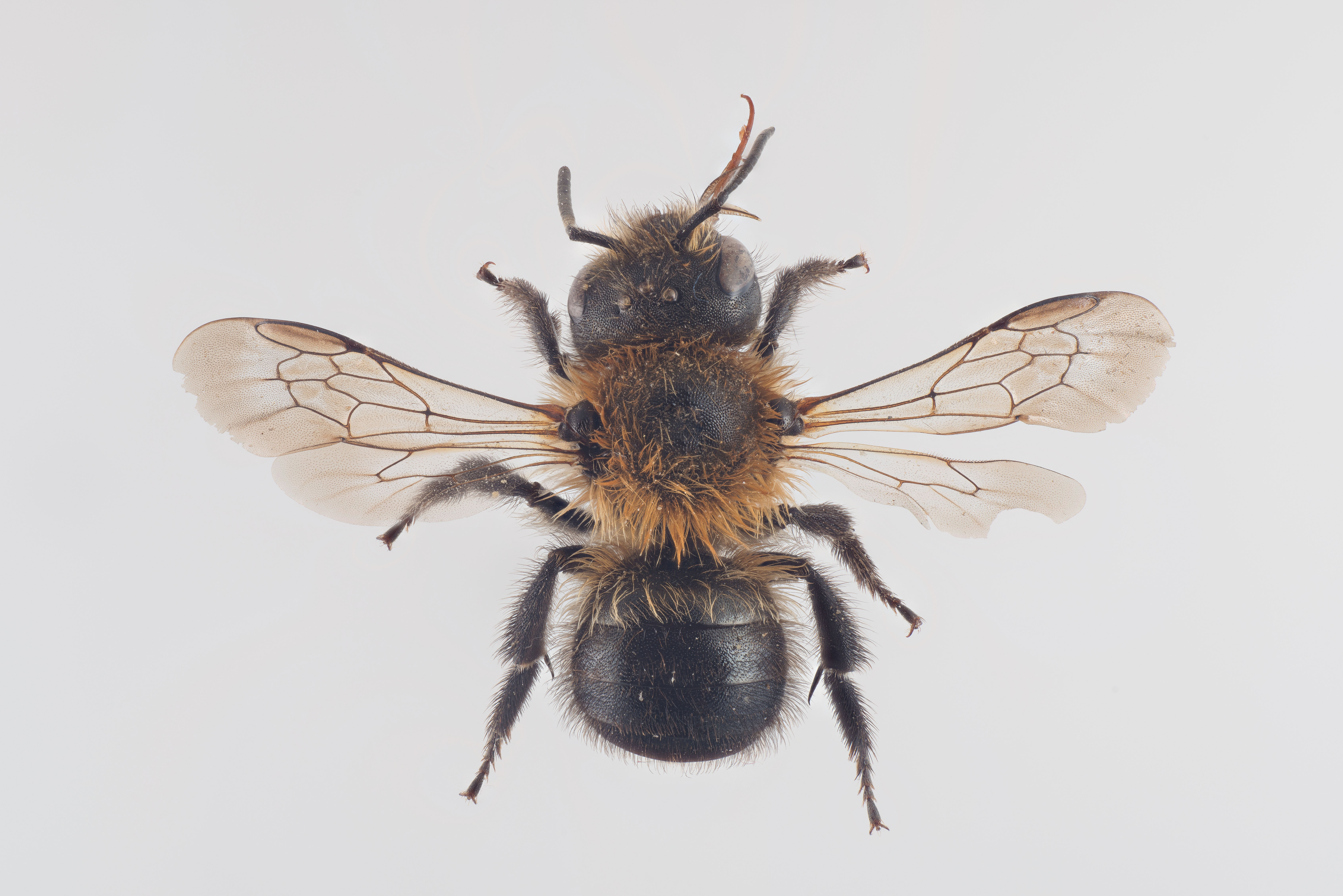

Scientific classification
- Kingdom: Animalia
- Phylum: Arthropoda
- Class: Insecta
- Order: Hymenoptera
- Family: Megachilidae
- Genus: Osmia
- Species: O. inermis

Binomial name
- Osmia inermis (Zetterstedt, 1838)

Synonyms
- Anthophora inermis Zetterstedt, 1838; Osmia globose Cresson, 1864; Osmia vulpecula Gerstcker, 1869; Osmia globosiformis Cockerell, 1910; Osmia bulgarica Friese, 1922

= Osmia inermis =

Species of bee

Osmia inermis, the mountain mason bee , is a species of mason bee from the family Megachilidae which has a Holarctic distribution.

== Description ==
A small matt black bee, the females are 10mm long and show some pale hairs on the body while the males are slightly smaller and have an entirely black pubescence over their body.

== Biology ==
Osmia inermis uses preexisting cavities as nest sites up to 200 brood cells are attached to the underside of stones, to the walls of small cavities in rocks and stones or in an exceptional case to the underside of a discarded heat shield from a vehicle catalytic converter. This species will also accept overturned terracotta saucers which are left out as artificial nesting sites. Cells are entirely built of leaf mastic, a wall of sand is often constructed to seal the nest stones towards the ground. Frequently, a group of females will communally build their brood cells under the same stone.

Inside the cells the broods take at least two years to mature, and it can take as long as four years. This has the effect of staggering the emergence adults, thus making allowance where the breeding season has adversely affected by poor summer weather. It is polylectic with a preference for Fabaceae; additional pollen sources include Vaccinium and Salix In Scotland this bee relies almost entirely on Lotus corniculata for its food. It is univoltine in Scotland and the flight period is late May to the end of July.

== Habitat ==
In Scotland Osmia inermis was found mainly on exposed, base-rich uplands, between 260–430 m above sea level. Favoured habitat there comprises exposed sheep pasture on low, dry hillocks on a south-facing mica-schist escarpment with a vegetation of heavily-grazed heather, with lichen and moss predominating amongst it. Near to the site the likely forage plants used by the bee there included Lotus corniculatus, Ajuga reptans and Vaccinium myrtillus Otherwise the species has an Arctic-alpine distribution, being found at low altitudes north of the Arctic Circle and in more montane locations further south.

The chrysidid wasp Chrysura hirsuta is known to have been reared from Scottish nests of Osmia inermis. After hatching the larva of the parasitoid attacks the bee larva when it has spun its tough cocoon. When mature the C. hirsuta larva spins its own cocoon inside the bee larva's cocoon. C. hirsuta seems to have an obligate, minimum, two-year life cycle which parallels that of O. inermis.

== Distribution ==
Holarctic, in Europe as far south as Mount Olympus, Greece and in North America it is found in eastern North America in Labrador, Quebec, the New England states and Wisconsin.

== Subspecies ==
There are two recognised subspecies.

- Osmia inermis inermis (Zetterstedt, 1838) - most of Europe, northern Asia and eastern North America.
- Osmia inermis bulgarica Friese, 1923 - Italy and the Balkans.

== Conservation ==
In Scotland Osmia inermis is under threat from the loss of suitable habitat, as its preferred habitat of upland calcareous grassland, is becoming increasingly rare in Scotland. Agricultural intensification is causing the loss of herb-rich, short sward grasslands, as do commercial afforestation or insufficient grazing. As an arctic-alpine species, O. inermis is likely to be negatively affected by warming of the Scottish climate due to anthropogenic climate change.
