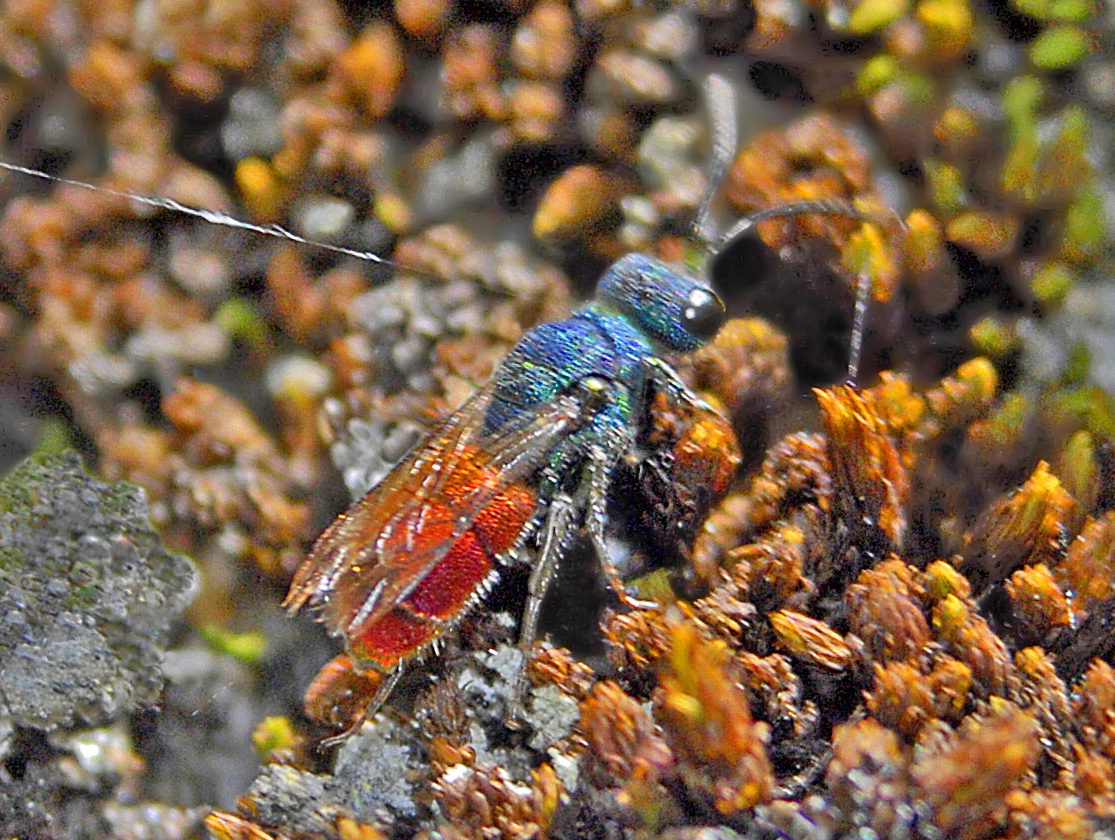

Scientific classification
- Domain: Eukaryota
- Kingdom: Animalia
- Phylum: Arthropoda
- Class: Insecta
- Order: Hymenoptera
- Family: Chrysididae
- Genus: Chrysis
- Species: C. ruddii

Binomial name
- Chrysis ruddii Shuckard, 1837

Synonyms
- Chrysis auripes Wesm.; Chrysis comosa Haupt

= Chrysis ruddii =

Species of wasp

Chrysis ruddii, the ruby-tailed wasp, is a species of cuckoo wasps, an insects in the family Chrysididae.

== Etymology ==
The species name ruddii honors the English entomologist Rev. George Thomas Rudd.

== Subspecies ==
Subspecies include:

- Chrysis ruddii brevimarginata Linsenmaier, 1959
- Chrysis ruddii ruddii Shuckard, 1836

== Distribution ==
The species occurs in part of Europe (Britain, Norway, Sweden, Finland, Denmark, Netherlands, Belgium, Luxembourg, France, Germany, Switzerland, Italy, Poland, Hungary) and in the Near East.

== Habitat ==
This species especially occurs on dry meadows, forest margins and sun-exposed rock cliffs, at an elevation over 2,000 metres (6,600 ft) above sea level.

== Description ==
Chrysis ruddii can reach a body length of approximately 7–10 millimetres (0.28–0.39 in). These wasps are characterized by an intense green or blue coloration, included head, mesosoma and the first and second joints of the geniculate (elbowed) antennae. In the females there are sometimes golden areas. This species shows a long white pubescence, a wide pronotum, a dense punctation on metathorax, a red/bronze coloration on the ventral side of the legs. The collar and the scutellum may be cupreus. The abdomen is minutely punctured, especially on the second gastral tergite, with a carmine pink coloration and a coppery refulgence.

This species is rather similar and can be confused with Chrysis ignita, Chrysura hirsuta, Chrysis fulgida and Chrysis rutiliventris.

== Biology ==
Adults fly from mid May to September. They mainly visit Apiaceae, feeding on the liquid nectar. The larvae live as parasites of various digger wasps and potter wasps (Eumenes unguiculata, Eumenes coarctata, Eumenes unguiculata, Eumenes infundibuliformis, Ancistrocerus parietum, Ancistrocerus oviventris, Ancistrocerus trinauriae, Odynerus spinipes, Odynerus reniformis, Osmia adunca, Osmia caementaria, Osmia spinolae, Osmia ravouxi and Anthidium species).
