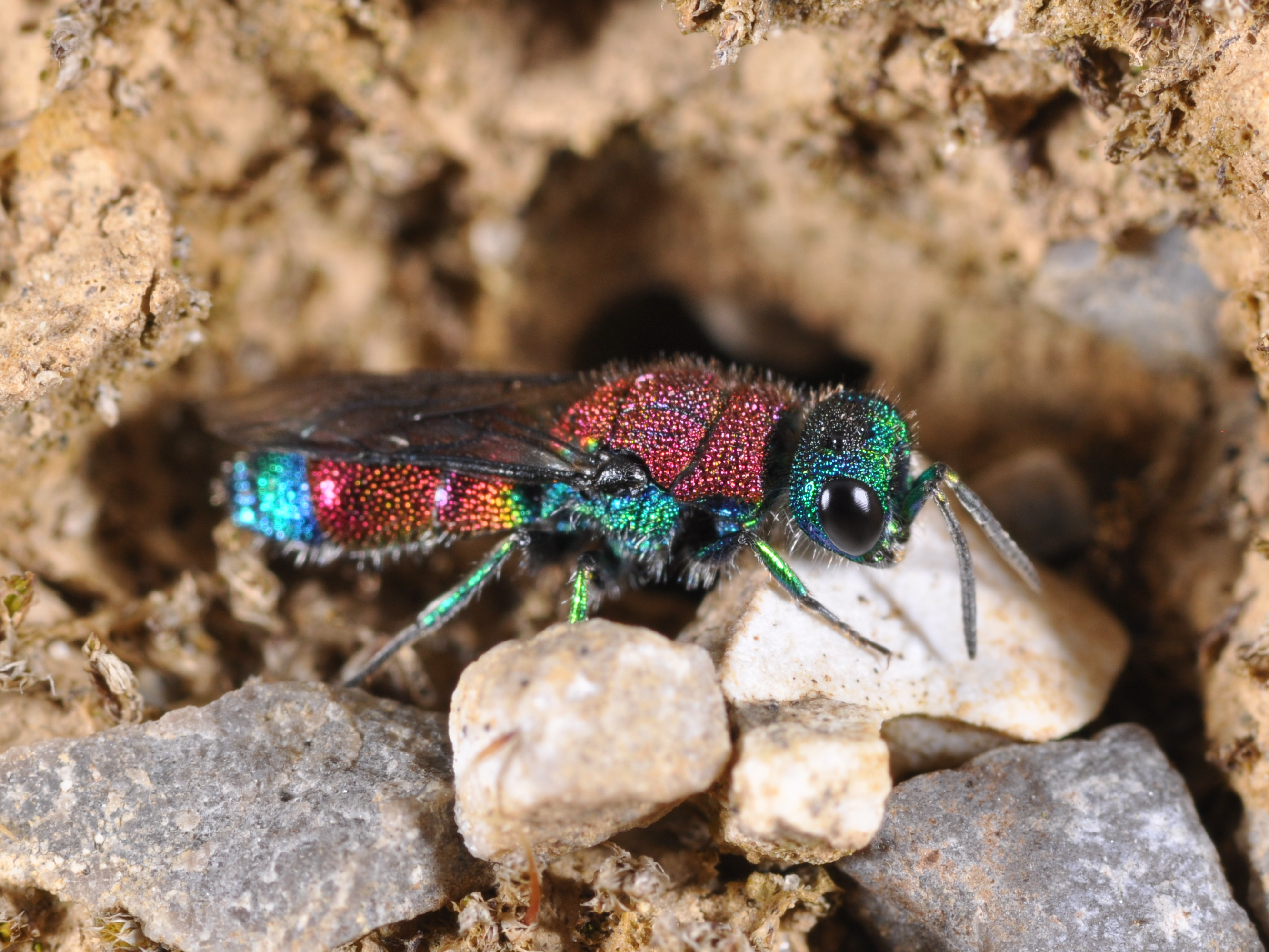

Scientific classification
- Kingdom: Animalia
- Phylum: Arthropoda
- Clade: Pancrustacea
- Class: Insecta
- Order: Hymenoptera
- Family: Chrysididae
- Genus: Chrysis
- Species: C. viridula

Binomial name
- Chrysis viridula Linnaeus, 1761

= Chrysis viridula =

Species of wasp

Chrysis viridula is a Western Palearctic species of cuckoo wasp, first described by Carl Linnaeus in 1761. Chrysis viridula is included in the genus Chrysis, and the family Chrysididae (the cuckoo wasps). It is a parasitoid of a number of species of eumenid wasp, mainly those in the genus Odynerus.

== Distribution ==
It is found throughout southern England and the Channel Islands, and north to northeast Yorkshire. In Wales, it is restricted to coastal areas only and has not been found in Scotland or Ireland. It is also found in many parts of mainland Europe (Norway, Sweden, Finland, Denmark, The Netherlands, Belgium, France, Spain, Germany, Italy, Poland, Hungary and Romania) and extending eastwards to the Caucasus, and southwards to North Africa.

== Appearance ==
Chrysis viridula has a total length of about six to nine millimetres (0.24 to 0.35 in). The color of the head ranges from green to turquoise, and the thorax has a flame-like color. The main body of the insect has also been described to be colorful.

== Genetics ==
In Hymenoptera, the super-families of Ichnuemonidae and Chrysididae have the greatest number of chromosomes, each corresponding to about n=21. Thus, Chrysis viridula has a chromosome count which is equal to about 42 in its karyotype.

== Biology ==
In Britain Chrysis viridula is a parasitoid of the eumenids Odynerus spinipes and Odynerus melanocephalus, it has a flight period of June to August but has been recorded a month either side of this. The adults feed on a variety of flowers but mainly on umbellifers. It is normally found in the vicinity of the host wasps' nest tunnels on hard banks of sand, earth or clay, and once on the wall of a church. The females lay eggs in the brood cells of the host wasps as the host larva is preparing to pupate and is creating its cocoon, or just after the cocoon has been completed. The female C. viridula can open the host cocoons to oviposit within them. When the larval C. viridula hatches its eats the host larva. On the mainland of Europe other known hosts include Odynerus reniformis, Ancistrocerus parietum and Odynerus alpinus and in Italy its distribution extends to an altitude of 2,000 metres (6,600 ft).

This species has a thick exoskeleton which protects it from the defensive stinging attacks of the host females, to enhance this defence the female C. viridula has a concave underside and it can curl itself into a defensive ball. If she finds an undefended nest she will reverse down the nest chimney to lay her egg on the host wasp's egg. The host wasp does not normally detect the cuckoo wasp egg and seals the nest up for the winter for the new adult parasitoid to emerge in the following summer.

== Gallery ==
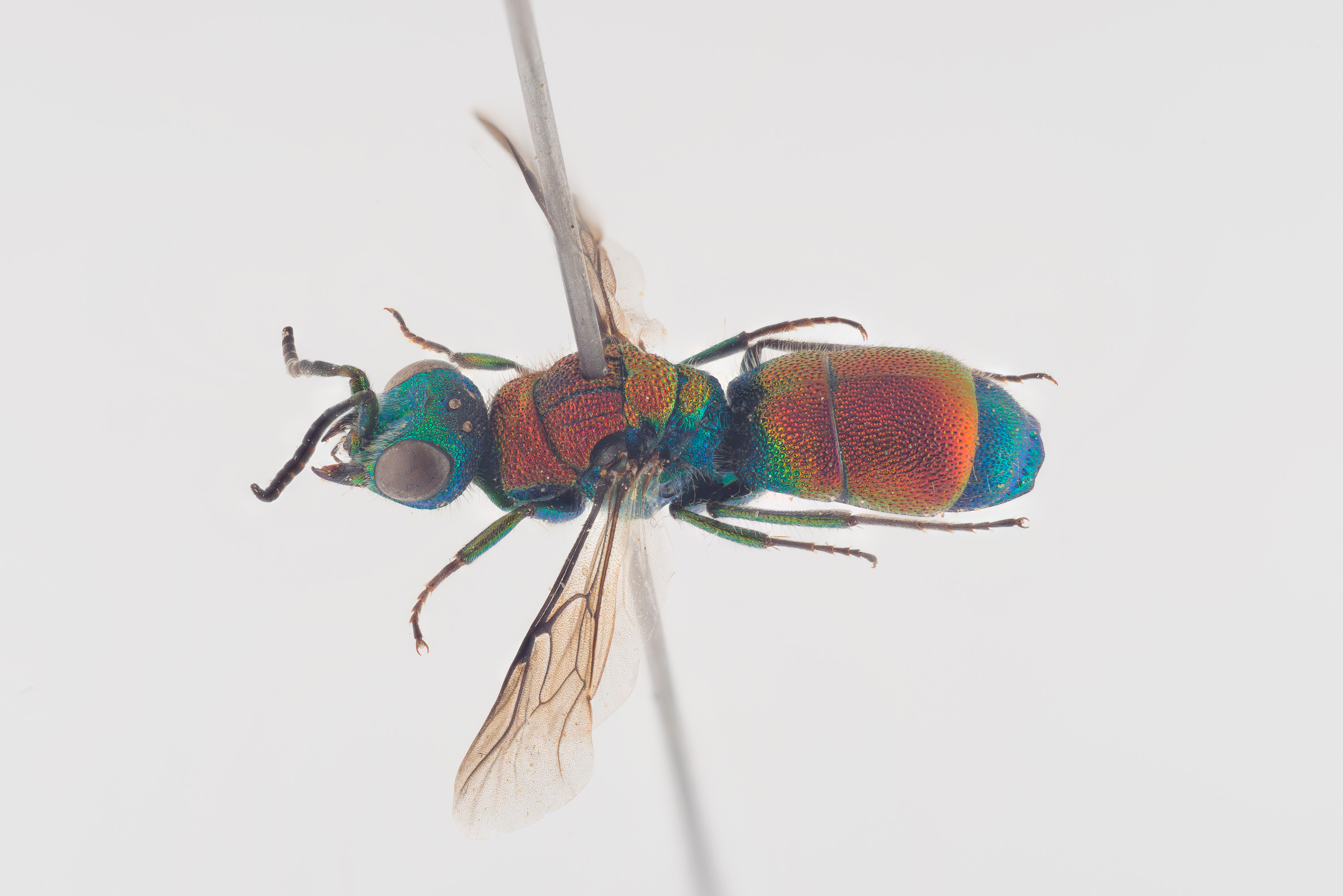

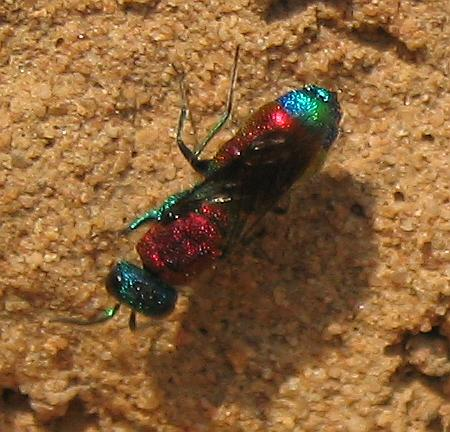
