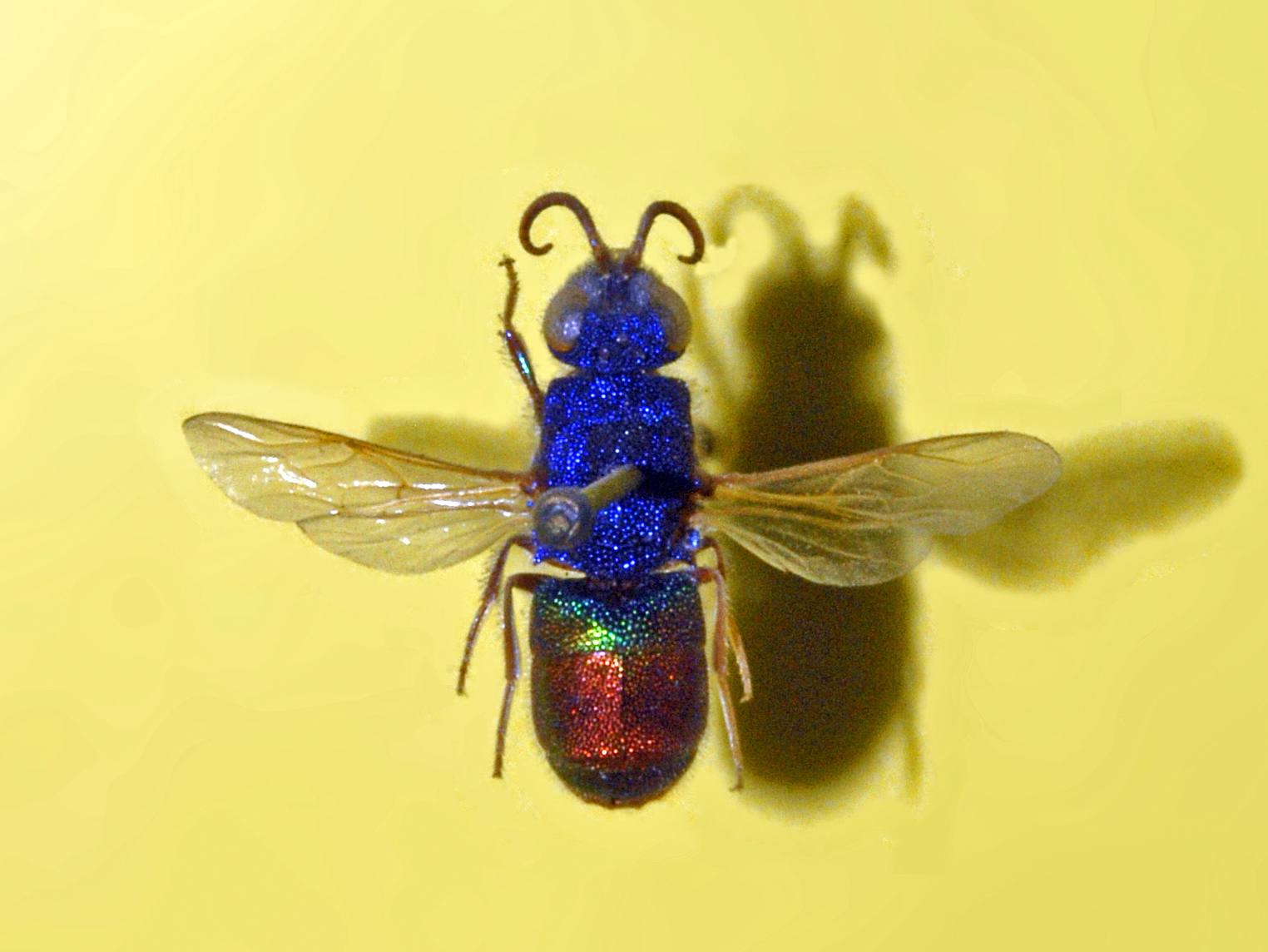
- Chrysis comparata. Museum specimen

Scientific classification
- Kingdom: Animalia
- Phylum: Arthropoda
- Class: Insecta
- Order: Hymenoptera
- Family: Chrysididae
- Genus: Chrysis
- Species: C. comparata

Binomial name
- Chrysis comparata Lepeletier, 1806

= Chrysis comparata =

Species of wasp

Chrysis comparata is a species of cuckoo wasps (insects in the family Chrysididae).

== Subspecies ==
- Chrysis comparata comparata Lepeletier, 1806
- Chrysis comparata orientica Linsenmaier, 1959

== Appearance ==
The head and thorax are bluish green. The eyes and antennae are black. The abdomen is golden red, and the basis of the first segment is bluish green. The wings are smoked. The pronotum may be longer than the scutellum.

== Biology ==
These wasps mainly parasitize hymenoptera belonging to the species Pemphredon unicolor, Hylaeus confusus, Paranthidiellum lituratum and Anthidium manicatum.

== Locations ==
This species can be found in Europe and in the Near East.
