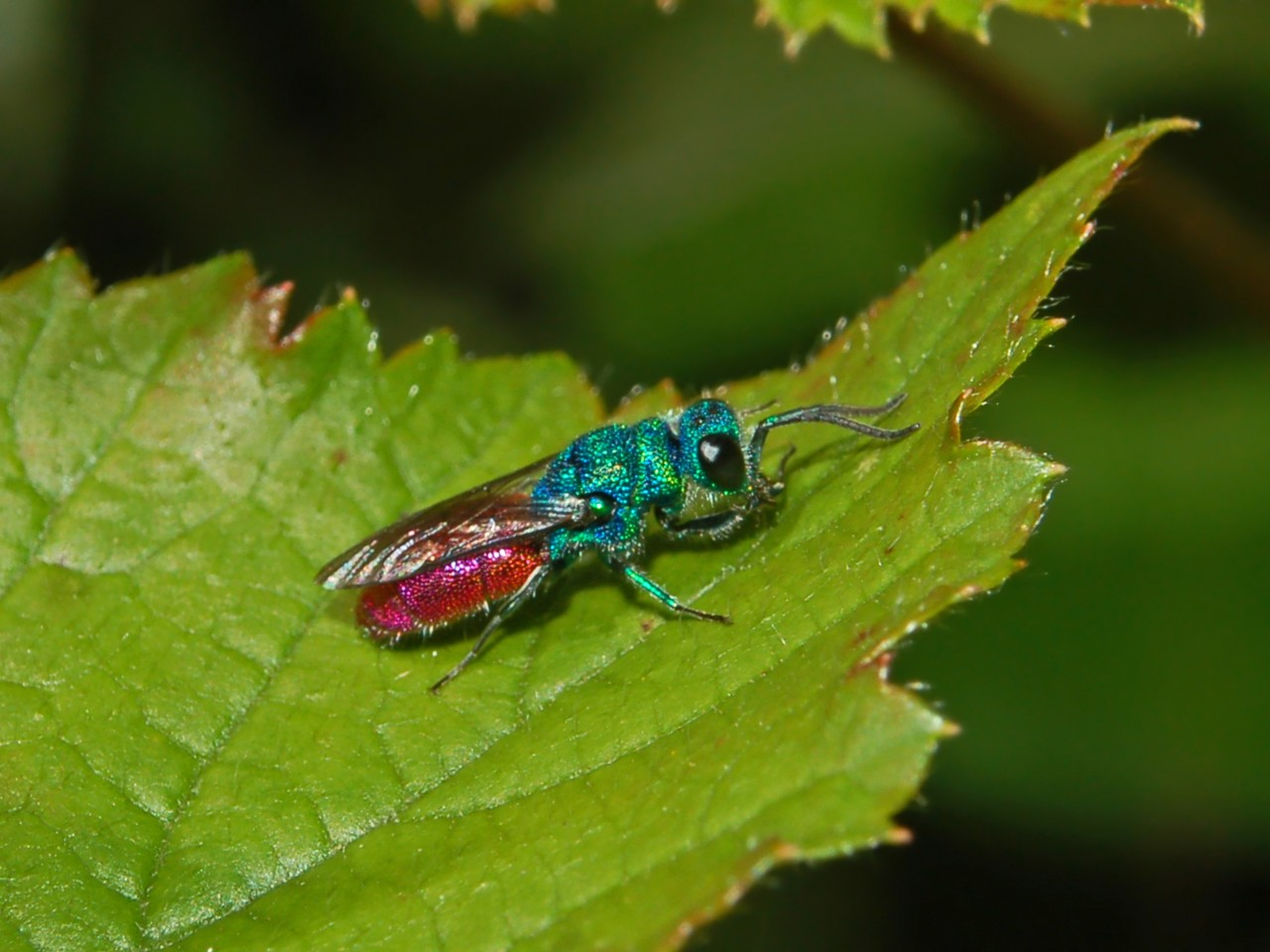

Scientific classification
- Kingdom: Animalia
- Phylum: Arthropoda
- Clade: Pancrustacea
- Class: Insecta
- Order: Hymenoptera
- Family: Chrysididae
- Genus: Chrysis
- Species: C. inaequalis

Binomial name
- Chrysis inaequalis Dahlbom, 1845

= Chrysis inaequalis =

Species of wasp

Chrysis inaequalis is a species of cuckoo wasps (insects in the family Chrysididae). The species occurs in Central and Southern Europe and in the Near East. The head and the thorax are shiny metallic blue-green, while the abdomen is red. Adults grow up to 5–10 millimetres (0.20–0.39 in) long and can be encountered from late June to mid September, especially flying on sun-exposed walls, on rocks and on dead wood.

== Biology ==
This species is a parasite of bees and wasps. Main hosts are Osmia, Eumenes and Odynerus species. The adults feed on sweet foods such as nectar, honeydew or various exudates.

== Subspecies ==
- Chrysis inaequalis var. cypernensis Linsenmaier, 1987
- Chrysis inaequalis var. inaequalis Dahlbom, 1845
- Chrysis inaequalis var. sapphirina Semenov, 1912
