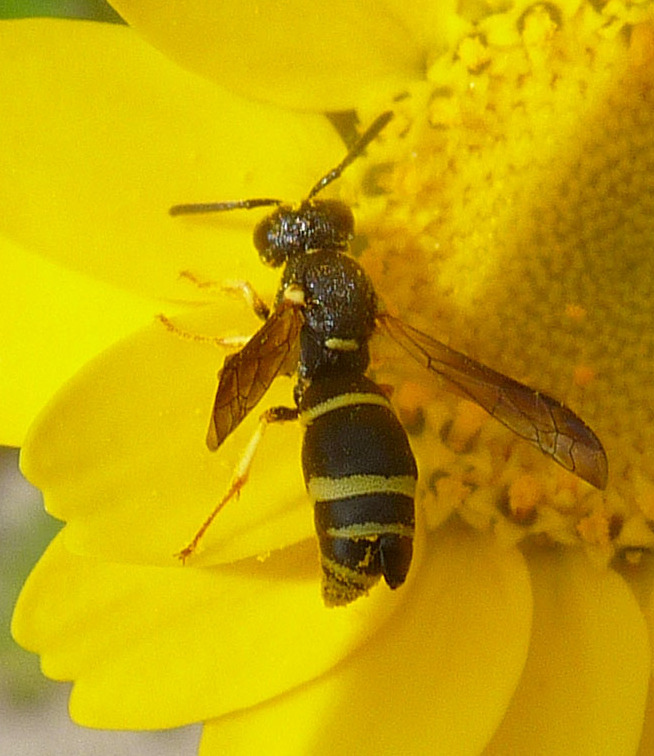
- Odynerus spinipes showing parasitism by a Strepsipteran

Scientific classification
- Kingdom: Animalia
- Phylum: Arthropoda
- Clade: Pancrustacea
- Class: Insecta
- Order: Hymenoptera
- Family: Vespidae
- Genus: Odynerus
- Species: O. spinipes

Binomial name
- Odynerus spinipes Linnaeus, 1758

Synonyms
- Vespa spinipes Linnaeus, 1758; Vespa quinquefasciata Fabricius, 1793; Odynerus muticus Zetterstedt, 1839; Odynerus flavicapus Mader, 1936; Odynerus amurensis Blüthgen, 1941; Hoplomerus scutellaris Blüthgen, 1940

= Odynerus spinipes =

Species of wasp

Odynerus spinipes, the spiny mason wasp, is a species of potter wasp from western Europe. It is the type species of the genus Odynerus, being first described by Carl Linnaeus in his landmark 1758 10th edition of Systema Naturae.

== Distribution ==
Odynerus spinipes is found in northwestern Europe and Scandinavia as far north as central Sweden and south to the Alps and southern France, there is also a record from Kazakhstan. in Great Britain it is found as far north as southern Scotland but there are very few records from Ireland. It is now thought to be extirpated from Scotland.

== Habitat ==
Odynerus spinipes prefers open habitats and scrub, in Essex it has been mostly found in post industrial sites.

== Biology ==
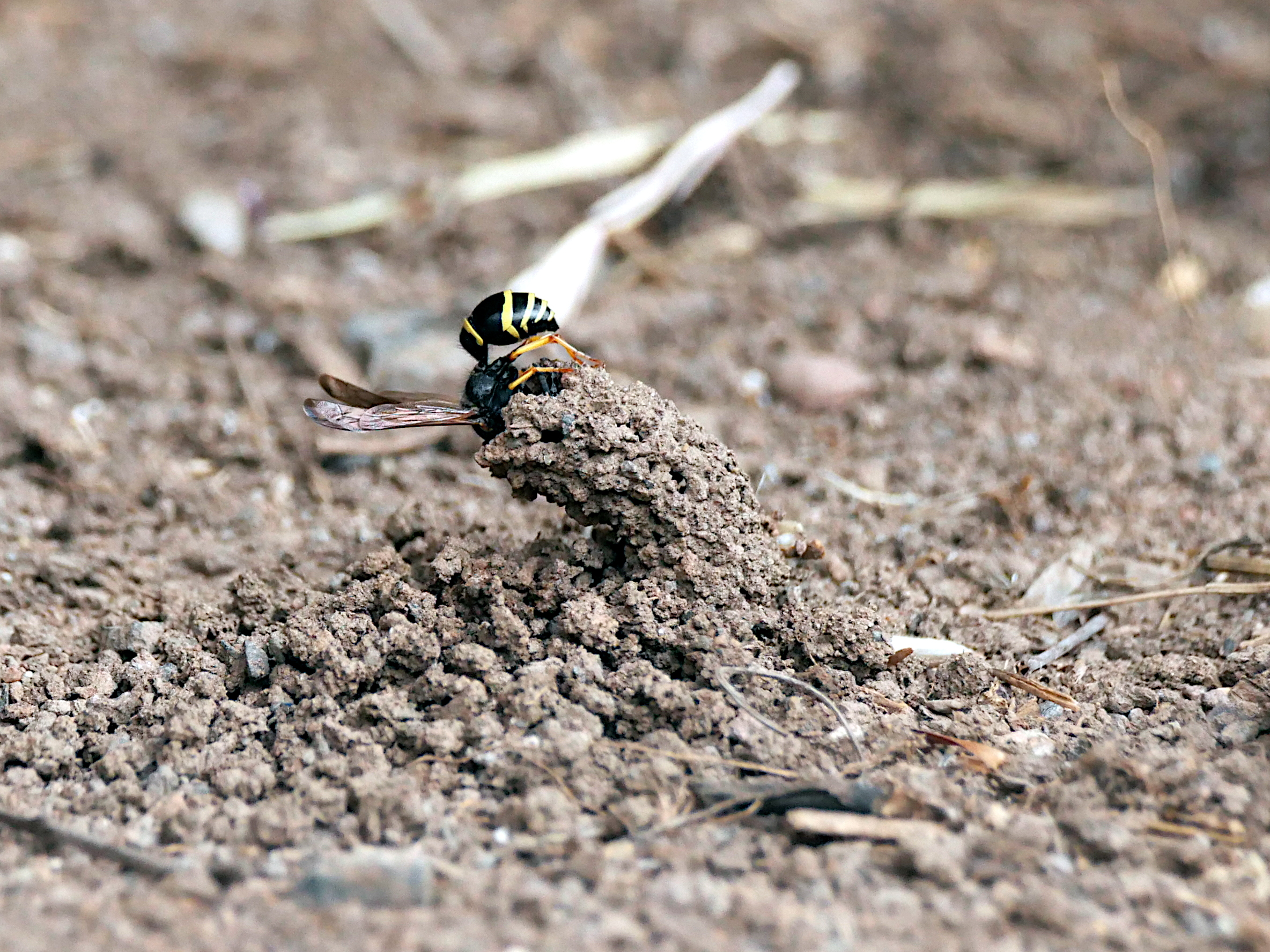
Female with prey at the entrance to the nest, arising from ground.

Odynerus spinipes adults mate soon after emergence and mating is followed by a search for nest sites which are then prepared and the cells provisioned with prey by the females. The prey is weevil larvae of the genus Hyperba (family Curculionidae). The nests are constructed where there are vertical banks of hard earth, usually of clay but sometimes sand is used. The location of the nest is first dampened with water before a group of five to six cells is created immediately behind the vertical face of the bank. A "chimney" up to 30 mm long which curves over and downwards is made from the spoil created by the excavation. It is not known what the function of the chimney is but one theory is that it may shelter the burrow from rain in the exposed situations the wasp chooses for nesting or the chimney may deter potential kleptoparasites and parasitoids. As suitable nesting sites are scarce several females may be found nesting close together in small aggregations.

The female wasp hunts for weevil larvae which are immobilised by stinging and by chewing. The immobilised prey is transported in the mandibles held against the underside of the body with the forelimbs. As many as 30 beetle larvae have been recorded in a single cell. The egg is laid before the prey is collected and is suspended from the side of the cell by a fine filament. The egg hatches a few days after it is laid. The collected beetle larvae are consumed by the wasp's larva in a matter of weeks; the wasp then probably overwinters as a prepupa.

The adults' flight period in Great Britain is between May and August but they are most common in June, the adults nectar at flowers with short coronas and accessible nectaries and they will also feed on the honeydew secretions of aphids and from extra floral nectaries.

=== Parasites ===
O. spinipes is used by the cuckoo wasp Chrysis viridula which lays its egg in a cell while the O. spinipes larva is spinning its cocoon or it bites into the newly completed cocoon, sometimes breaking into the cell through its wall. When the egg hatches the larval cuckoo wasp destroys its host's eggs and then consumes the cached prey. Other species of cuckoo wasps from the genus Chrysis as well as Pseudospinolia neglecta and Pseudomalus auratus have been recorded in the nests of O. spinipes. O. spinipes expresses two very different hydrocarbon compositions in its cuticle, known as cuticular hydrocarbons, each of these patterns is apparently mimicked by one of the kleptoparasitic cuckoo wasps, Chrysis mediata and Pseudospinolia neglecta. The cuticular hydrocarbon profile of Chrysis viridula does not show mimicry of its host due to its particular strategy for oviposition.
