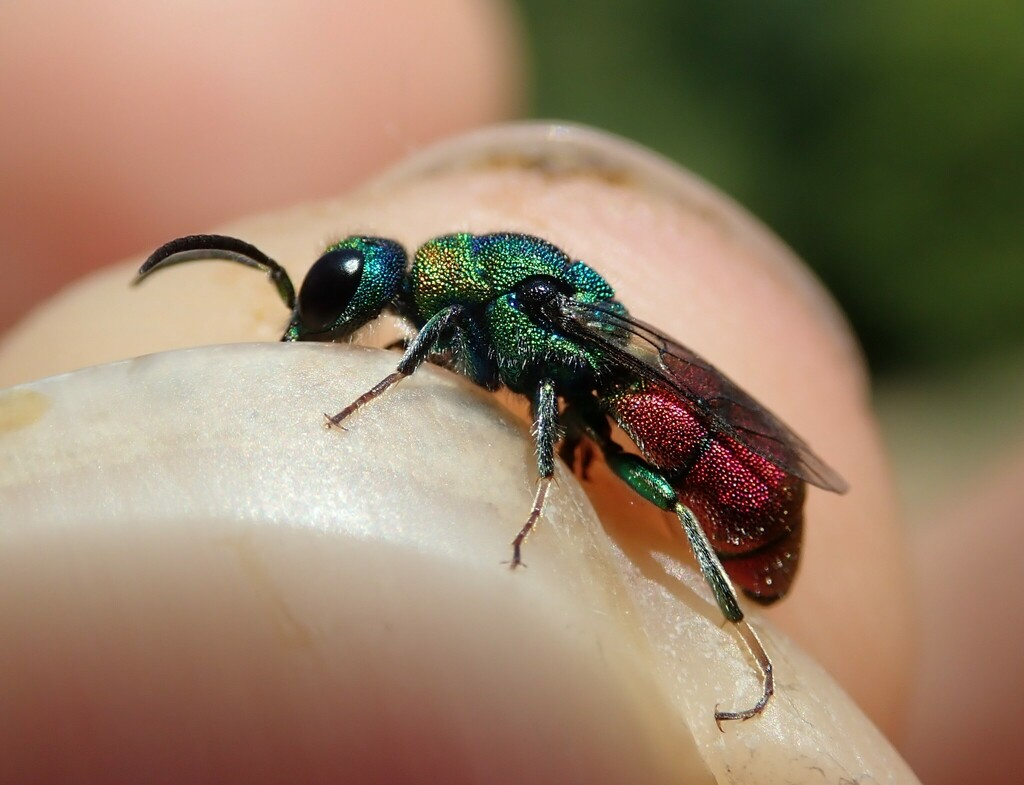
- Chrysis elegans from Southern France

Scientific classification
- Kingdom: Animalia
- Phylum: Arthropoda
- Clade: Pancrustacea
- Class: Insecta
- Order: Hymenoptera
- Family: Chrysididae
- Genus: Chrysis
- Species: C. elegans

Binomial name
- Chrysis elegans Lepeletier, 1806

Subspecies
- Chrysis elegans elegans Lepeletier, 1806; Chrysis elegans interrogata Linsenmaier, 1959; Chrysis elegans transcaspica Mocsáry, 1889

= Chrysis elegans =

Species of wasp

Chrysis elegans is a species of cuckoo wasps (i.e. insects in the family Chrysididae) found in Southern Europe.
