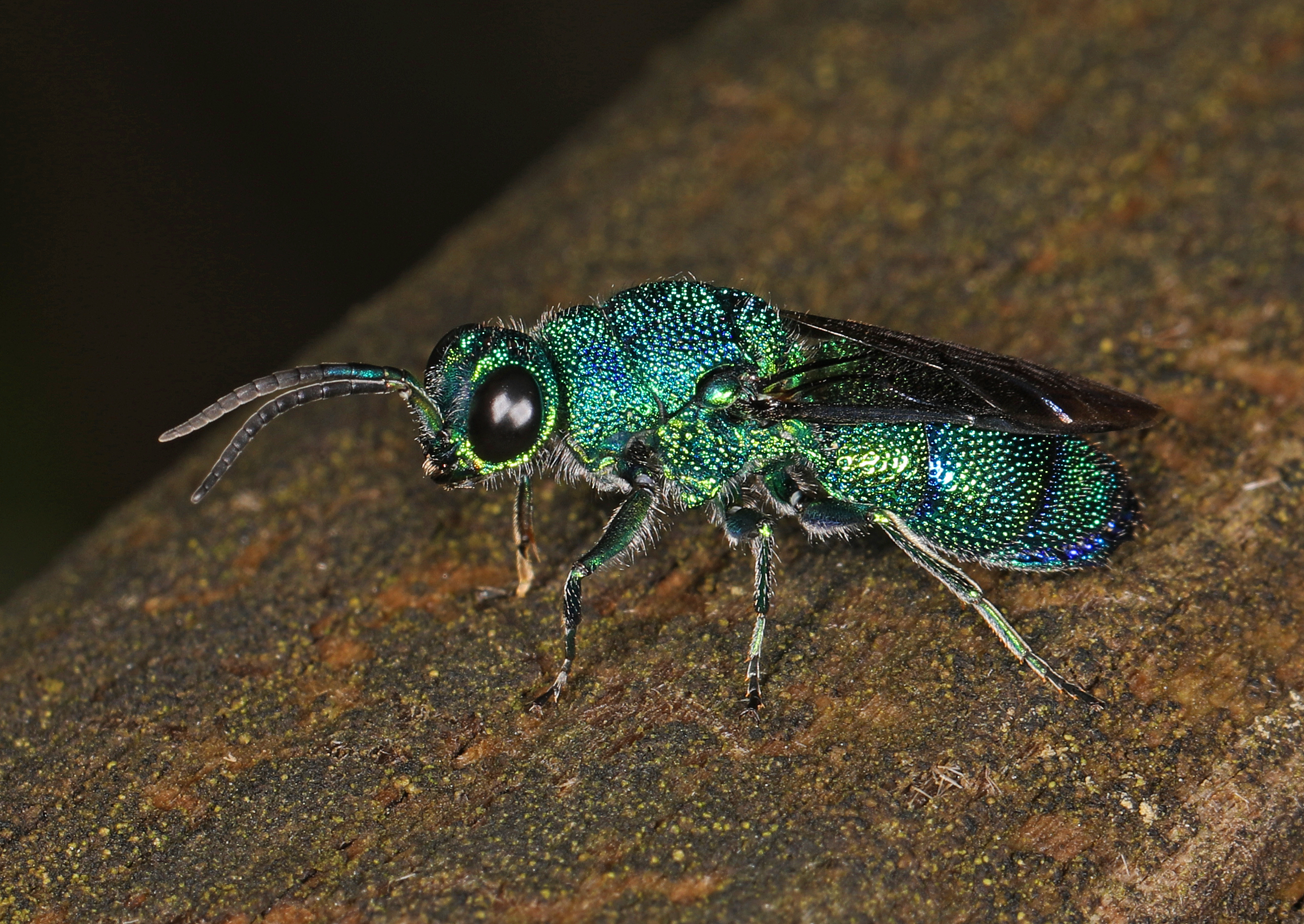

Scientific classification
- Kingdom: Animalia
- Phylum: Arthropoda
- Class: Insecta
- Order: Hymenoptera
- Family: Chrysididae
- Genus: Chrysis
- Species: C. smaragdula

Binomial name
- Chrysis smaragdula Lepeletier & Serville, 1825

= Chrysis smaragdula =

Species of wasp

Chrysis smaragdula is a species of cuckoo wasp in the family Chrysididae.
