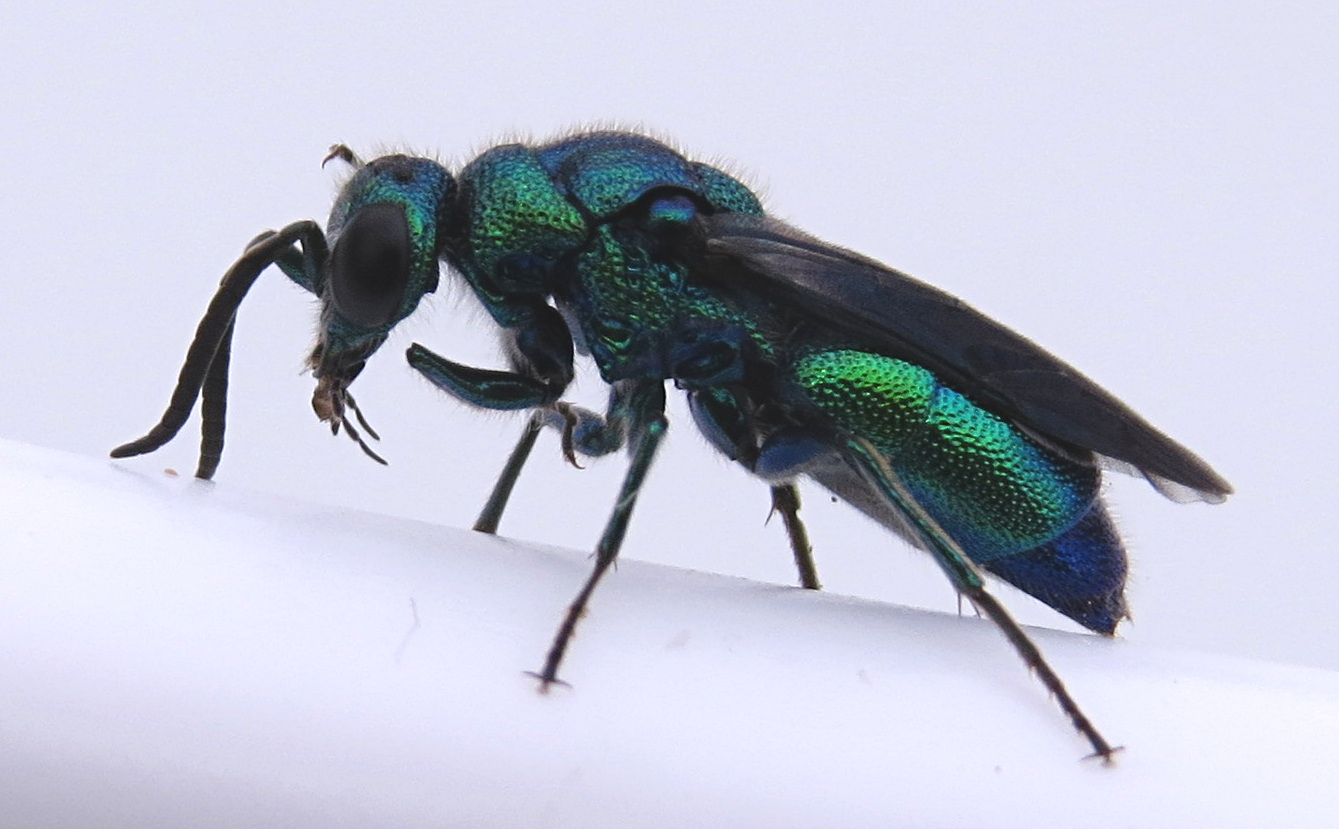
- Chrysis angolensis

Scientific classification
- Kingdom: Animalia
- Phylum: Arthropoda
- Class: Insecta
- Order: Hymenoptera
- Family: Chrysididae
- Subfamily: Chrysidinae
- Tribe: Chrysidini
- Genus: Chrysis
- Species: C. angolensis

Binomial name
- Chrysis angolensis Radoszkowski, 1881

= Chrysis angolensis =

Species of wasp

Chrysis angolensis is a species of cuckoo wasp in the family Chrysididae, found throughout much of the world. It has been recently recorded as being introduced to French Polynesia. The species is a parasite of mud dauber nests, especially the black and yellow mud dauber Sceliphron caementarium.
