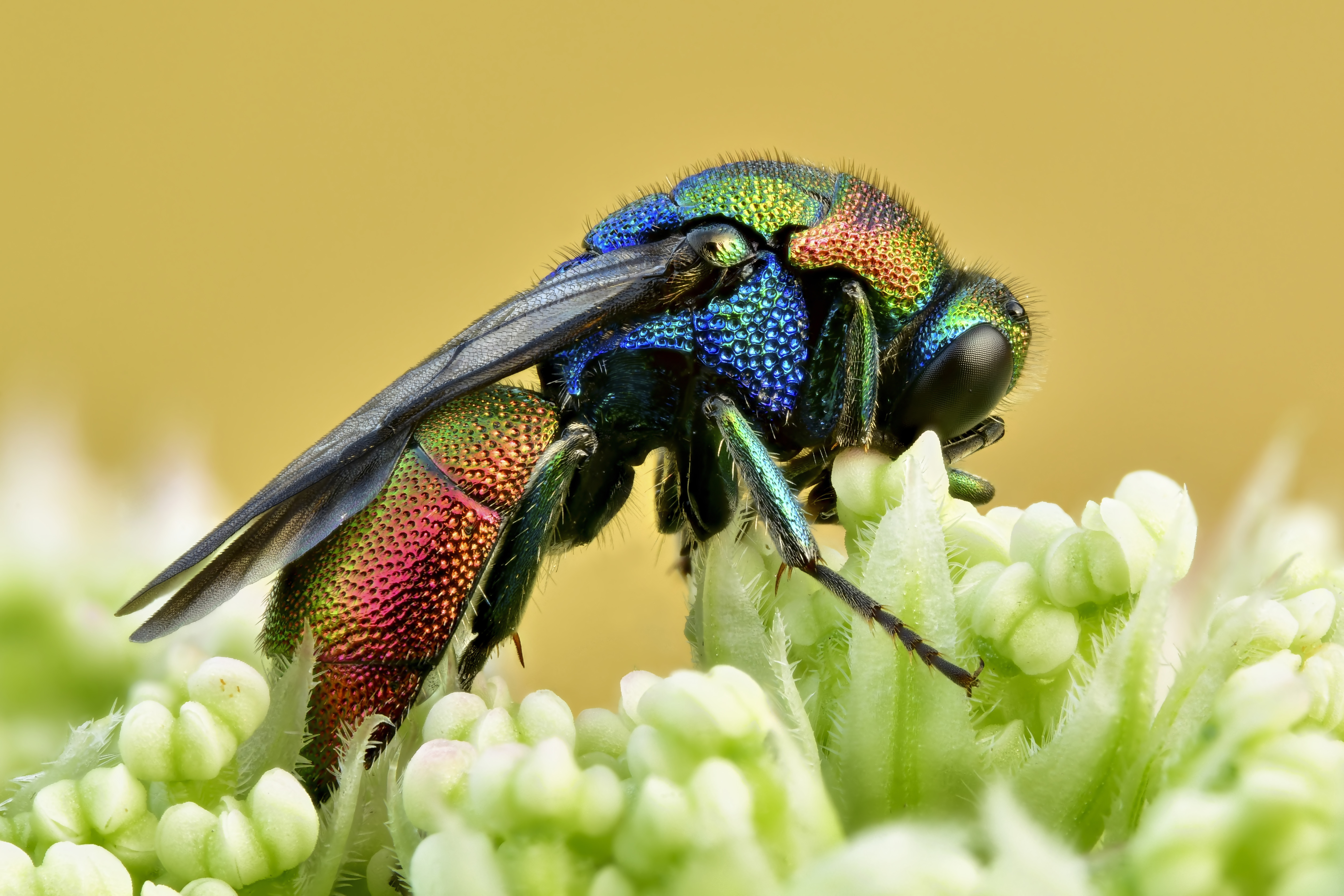

Scientific classification
- Kingdom: Animalia
- Phylum: Arthropoda
- Clade: Pancrustacea
- Class: Insecta
- Order: Hymenoptera
- Family: Chrysididae
- Genus: Chrysis
- Species: C. ignita

Binomial name
- Chrysis ignita (Linnaeus, 1758)

= Chrysis ignita =

Species of wasp

Chrysis ignita is a species of cuckoo wasp. It is one of a group of species which are difficult to separate and which may be referred to as ruby-tailed wasps.

Cuckoo wasps are parasitoids and kleptoparasites, laying their eggs in the nests of other species where their young consume the larvae of their hosts. They have a number of adaptations which have evolved to equip them for their life cycle. They have metallic, armored bodies, and can roll up into balls to protect themselves from harm when infiltrating the nests of their hosts. Unlike most other aculeates, however, cuckoo wasps cannot sting.

The hosts of Chrysis ignita are believed to be potter wasps such as Ancistrocerus parietum. Chrysis ignita is found across the Palearctic excluding Africa, from western Europe to China and Japan.

== Taxonomy and phylogeny ==
Chrysis ignita is a chrysidid wasp with a typical colorful, metallic exoskeleton; the stinger is reduced in size and used as an ovipositor.

== Description and identification ==
Chrysidids differ from other aculeate wasps (stinging Hymenoptera) in their reduction of the number of external body segments, the presence of 11 antennal articles, and wing veins enclosing 5 cells. Chrysis ignita is the best known of a group of very similar ruby-tailed wasps. The head and thorax range from a shiny green to blue, sometimes layered with a golden sheen. The abdomen, a deep ruby color, is its most distinctive feature. The exoskeleton sculpture appears textured, like a golf ball, with dimples, projections, crests, and holes ranging from micrometric to millimetric in size.

== Distribution and habitat ==
Chrysis ignita can be found in Britain and Ireland, in continental Europe, and through Russia to China and Japan at the eastern edge of the Palearctic. Its habitats overlap with those of its hosts, and thus it can be found near walls, quarries, bare cliff faces, and around dead wood in sunny places. Since chrysidids are solitary wasps whose lives are linked to and dependent on their hosts, they live in strict microhabitats. These microhabitats can be further categorized as places of rest and of parasitic activity. The environments in which they are found facilitate their identification and are often characterized by flowers, arid and sandy soil, old wood exposed to sunlight, pebbles, and aphid infested plants.

== Life history ==
=== Infiltration and egg deposition ===
Chrysidids are parasitoids, meaning that their parasitic activity, in most cases, kills their hosts. Some species are also kleptoparasites, meaning that they also use the host's food supplies as resources to sustain themselves. Chrysis ignita is both a parasite and a kleptoparasite. The female wasp possesses a long, telescopic ovipositor, which evolved from the reduction of the aculeate stinging apparatus. She uses this appendage to deposit her eggs inside the nest of the host wasp. The female ruby-tailed wasp will hide nearby, waiting for an ideal host. She will look for wasps that are in the process of digging burrows or dragging prey or bringing food back to their nests. She will then observe the nest until the host leaves or hitch a ride on the prey to slip in.

=== Parasitism ===
There are two basic strategies for parasitizing the host. In the first strategy, the cuckoo wasp eats the host egg or host young larva as soon as it hatches and moves on to eating the food resources in the nest (kleptoparasitism). In the second strategy, the cuckoo wasp waits for the host larva to reach its prepupal stage, and it kills it after clearing the nest of food sources. Each strategy has its advantages. The second strategy is generally utilized when the host species is a nectar and pollen gatherer, stocking up its nests with food sources that contain nutrients the cuckoo wasp cannot synthesize itself. If the host wasp is able to accumulate enough food to sustain both her offspring and the cuckoo larva, the cuckoo larva may consume only that food, leaving the host larva.

== Morphology ==
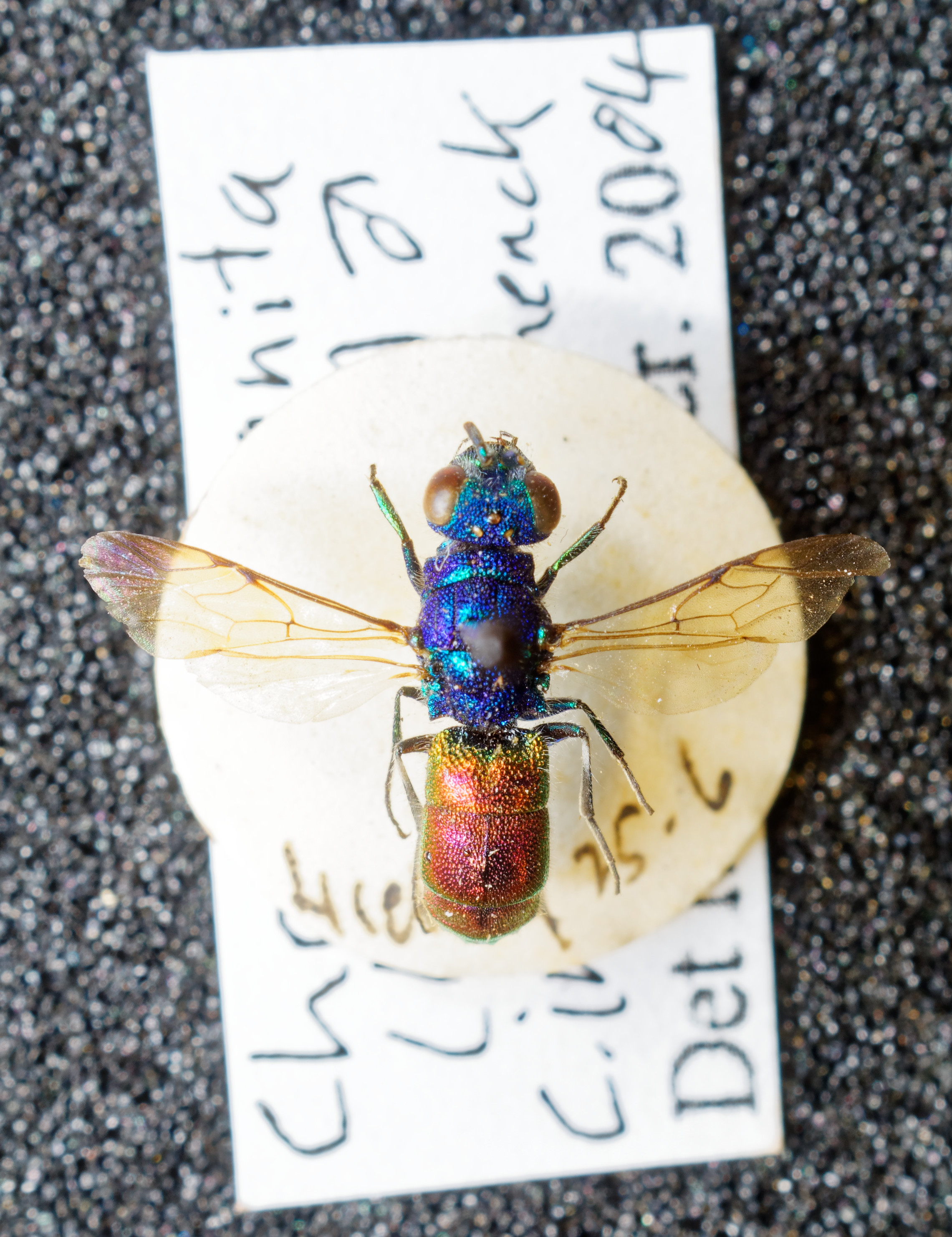
Chrysis ignita (museum specimen)

=== Head ===
In addition to bold coloration, cuckoo wasps tend to have large, bulging, well developed eyes. The head is generally flat or shallowly convex on the backside, without distinct bumps or grooves. In all cuckoo wasps, the occipital suture, or the groove at the back of the wasp's head, is reduced compared to in other wasp families. The majority of the lateral faces of the head are taken up by large compound eyes. See the insect anatomy category for vocabulary.

=== Face ===
Chrysidid faces, or the front of the head, distinguish them from other Hymenopterans. The antennae are attached low on the face, on the dorsal margin of clypeus. Generally, the clypeus is short and broad, truncating at the apex. The dorsal margin extends around and partly enclose the antennal sockets. Chrysidids have simple mandibles, with usually one or two subapical teeth.

=== Abdomen ===
The number of visible chrysidid segments varies among subfamilies. Chrysis ignita has three segmented abdomens in both sexes, which make sex determination difficult. The morphology of the abdominal anatomy translates into defensive function for the wasp. The visible segments are heavily sclerotized and weakly intermusculated. The abdominal segments I through IV possess spiracles, which the wasp breathes through. The chrysidid stinger is essentially nonfunctional, having been reduced to an ovipositor in females and a genital tube in males.

=== Coloration ===
Chrysis ignita is generally colored, and takes on its metallic, iridescent sheen through light interference, and thus varies with the viewing angle. The coloration is most apparent on the body of the wasp, and reduced to spots and stripes on the legs, mandibles, antenna, and abdominal tergites. Identification of Chrysis species based on color can be difficult due to the ephemeral nature of their coloration. Chemicals used to kill, preserve, or rehydrate specimens can alter the wasp's colors. It has also been hypothesized that there may be an environmental relation between the color of the adult and the physical parameters of its developmental environment, like temperature and humidity.

== Functional adaptions ==
=== Body armor and strategies ===
Chrysis ignita and its family of chrysidid wasps have evolved effective defenses for their risky life cycle. While the life of a cuckoo wasp may seem easy, it must drop off its young to be raised by a host wasp species. The ruby-tailed wasp has to infiltrate a nest full of defensive mother wasps, often armed with powerful stingers and jaws. Thus, they have developed defensive, functional body armor to protect themselves. The abdominal segments of their exoskeleton are highly sclerotized on the external surface and concave on the ventral surface. This allows the wasp to tuck in its vulnerable antenna and legs when curling into a defensive sphere. This adaption prevents the ruby-tailed wasp from being stung or mutilated when sneaking around a potential host's nest. The defense is so effective that even when the mother is caught in the host's nest, she will simply ball up and become impenetrable to even the strongest stings and mandibles. If they are caught, which happens quite often, they simply tuck and curl. The host wasp has no choice but to grab the balled up ruby-tailed wasp in its jaws and carry it outside to evict it. The ruby-tailed wasp, unharmed, simply makes its way back into the nest again at the next opportunity.

=== Ovipositor ===
The ruby-tailed wasp possesses an ovipositor, which evolved from the usual stinging apparatus of most Hymenopterans. Ruby-tailed wasps have been reported to parasitize a variety of hosts, and thus their ovipositor has evolved to be a multi-tool for infiltrating the nests of different wasps. For example, in parasitizing the mud nest of a digger wasp, the female ruby-tailed wasp will first wet a point of the dry mud before attempting to saw through it with her ovipositor. After several repetitions, she will succeed, and can then deposit her egg near or in the host wasp larval cell or cocoon. In the case of parasitizing paper wasp or mason bee, the ruby-tailed wasp's strong, indented ovipositor is used in a similar fashion to cut through the nest substrate to get to the host young. After the egg is deposited, the ruby-tailed wasp will cover the hole with the original nest material to leave minimal traces of its infiltration. It is essential that both she and her egg remain undetected to ensure the success of her offspring.

== Known hosts ==
The hosts of Chrysis ignita sensu stricto are believed to be potter wasps such as Ancistrocerus parietum. Chrysis ignita has been alleged to parasitize a wide variety of wasps and bees. However, most of these host records, including all those of bee species, are considered doubtful: attributable to misunderstandings, misidentifications, and taxonomic inconsistency.

== Methods of field study ==
As with other species, study may proceed using a Malaise trap, the more basic Moericke trap, or simply hunting on sight. Alternatively, nests of host wasps can be bred in the hope that some will be parasitized by Chrysis ignita.

== Research interest ==
=== Accessory nuclei ===
Accessory nuclei (AN) are organelles of mysterious function found in oocytes. Oocytes are highly specialized cells, which not only contain cellular and molecular components that allow for fertilization and embryo development, but also contain food sources for the developing organism. AN are found in the oocytes of several species of wasps, and also in nematodes, other insects, and mammalian embryonic cells. Bilinski and colleagues, in studying AN in Chrysis ignita, have shed light on the possible function of such accessory nuclei. They believe that AN have evolved independently of the rest of the wasp, so they can be used to genetically identify closely related species of chrysidid. Further research may give us insight into the complexity of AN and its role in oocyte compartmentalization – as well as its importance for early embryonic development.

=== Cajal bodies homologues ===
ANs form by budding off the nuclear envelope of the oocyte. They contain structures homologous Cajal Bodies, which are dense inclusions containing proteins and snRNPs. Bilinski and his colleagues have demonstrated that these bodies contain proteins and survival factors essential for the Hymenopteran development, such as survival of motor neuron (SMN) protein. They conjecture that this feature may be characteristic of all Hymenopterans, but further research is required to confirm this.

=== Mitochondrial phylogeny ===
The ignita species group of the genus Chrysis includes over 100 cuckoo wasp species. They all live the same parasitic life cycle and are morphologically indistinguishable. The lack of robust morphological features has hindered the construction of the phylogeny of these species of cuckoo wasp. To solve this problem, researchers in Estonia have collected and analyzed the mitochondrial sequences of 41 ingroup and 6 outgroup taxa. By using two simultaneous Bayesian sequence alignment methods, they were able to reconstruct the ignita phylogeny. Their phylogenetic analysis was backed up by maximum-parsimony and maximum-likelihood analyses and formed well-supported and defined clades. Their results suggest that several taxa that are currently grouped together under subspecies may in fact be separate species. This phylogenetic approach will be helpful for further study of not only Chrysis ignita, but other chrysidids.

=== Anal teeth and phylogeny ===
The vast diversity of the cuckoo wasp family, Chrysididae, includes thousands of species, which have individually adapted to their environment and evolved tools uniquely suited to their survival and parasitic activity. This morphological diversity makes it difficult to classify the species. Another breakthrough came through the use of mitochondrial and rRNA sequencing alignment. A group in Germany has identified anal teeth as an early adaptive differentiation, which has potential to be used in phylogenetic reconstruction.

== Chemical mimicry ==
Host-parasite interactions are prime examples of evolutionary arms races. The host evolves methods of detecting the parasite, and the parasite counters by evolving methods of evasion. It has been reported in some specialized Chrysis species that the cuckoo wasp chemically camouflages itself when infiltrating the nest of its host. Field observations indicate that the cuckoo wasp is only attacked when the host wasp visually recognizes it. If the cuckoo wasp can make it into the nest in the dark, research has shown that it can disguise itself chemically by secreting saturated and unsaturated hydrocarbons to match the scent profile of the host wasp. In these situations, even when the host wasp encounters the cuckoo wasp head on in the dark, the cuckoo wasp remains undetected.
