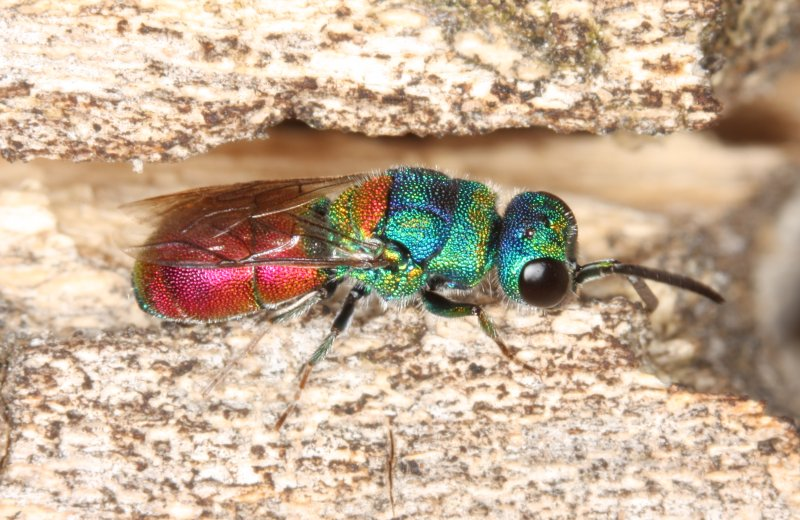
- A live individual of Chrysis scutellaris
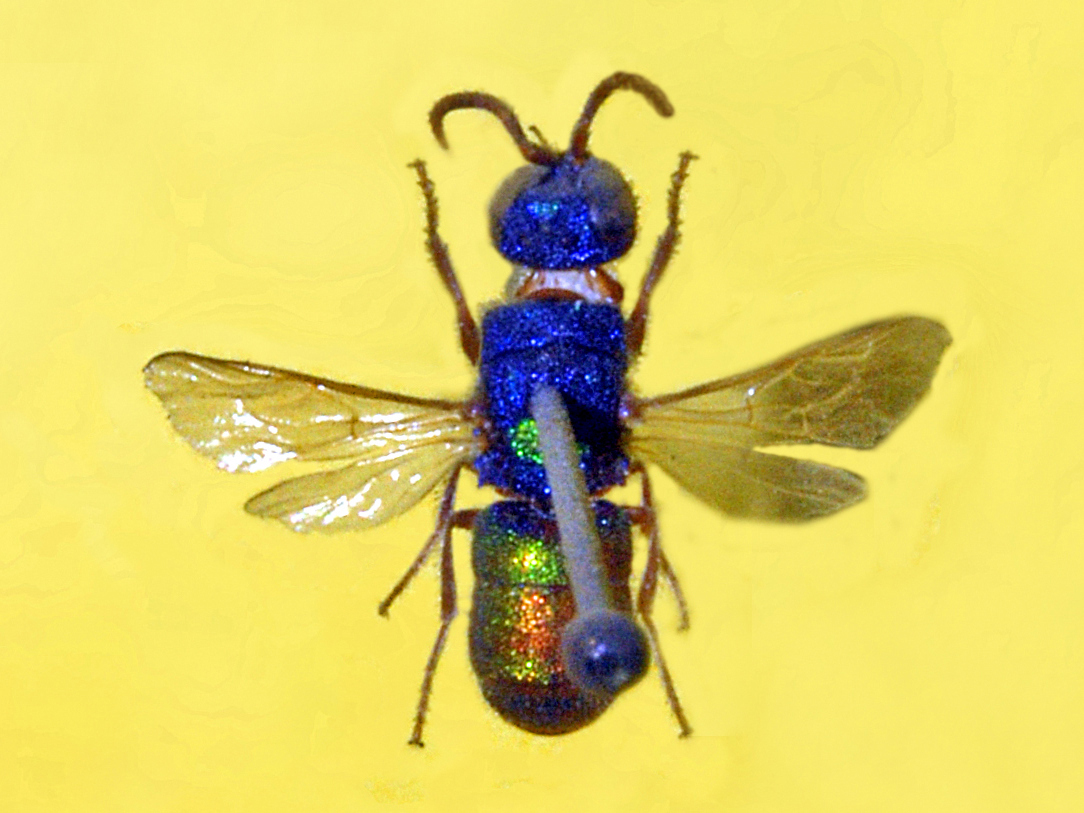
- Chrysis scutellaris. Museum specimen

Scientific classification
- Kingdom: Animalia
- Phylum: Arthropoda
- Class: Insecta
- Order: Hymenoptera
- Family: Chrysididae
- Genus: Chrysis
- Species: C. scutellaris

Binomial name
- Chrysis scutellaris Fabricius, 1794

= Chrysis scutellaris =

Species of wasp

Chrysis scutellaris is a species of cuckoo wasps (insects in the family Chrysididae).

== Subspecies ==
- Chrysis scutellaris marteni Linsenmaier, 1951
- Chrysis scutellaris scutellaris Fabricius, 1794

== Description ==
Chrysis scutellaris can reach a length of 6–9 millimetres (0.24–0.35 in). Head and chest are greenish blue while scutellum and abdomen are mainly golden red. At the rear edge of the third tergite it has 4 teeth.

== Biology ==
Chrysis scutellaris fly from late June to early August. The larvae parasitize solitary wasps (Eumenes pomiformis) and bees (Halictus maculatus).

== Distribution and habitat ==
These quite common wasps can be found in most of Europe and in North Africa (Algeria, Egypt). This species prefers warm, open and sandy areas.
