= Ruddii =

Ruddii may refer to:

- Candidatus Carsonella ruddii, Gammaproteobacteria
- Chrysis ruddii, species of cuckoo wasp
- Embolemus ruddii, species of wasp
