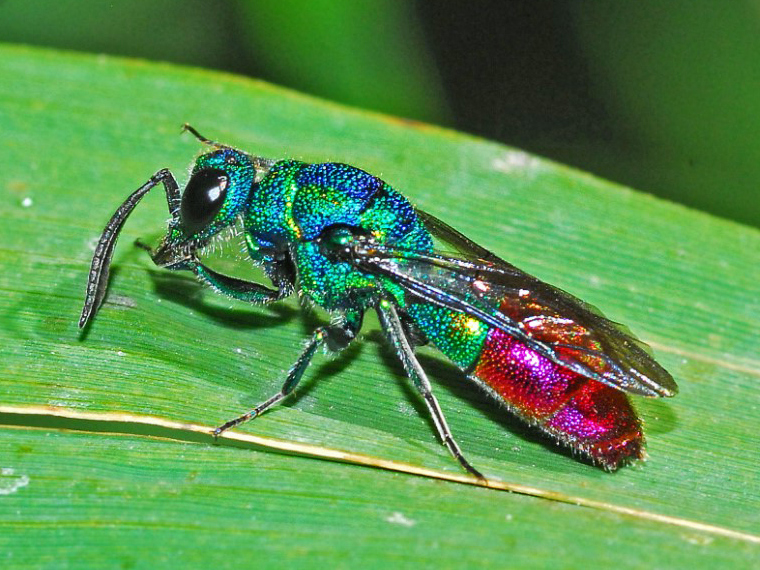

Scientific classification
- Kingdom: Animalia
- Phylum: Arthropoda
- Clade: Pancrustacea
- Class: Insecta
- Order: Hymenoptera
- Family: Chrysididae
- Genus: Chrysis
- Species: C. fulgida

Binomial name
- Chrysis fulgida Linnaeus, 1761

= Chrysis fulgida =

Species of insect

Chrysis fulgida, the ruby-tailed wasp, is a species of cuckoo wasp in the family Chrysididae.

== Distribution ==
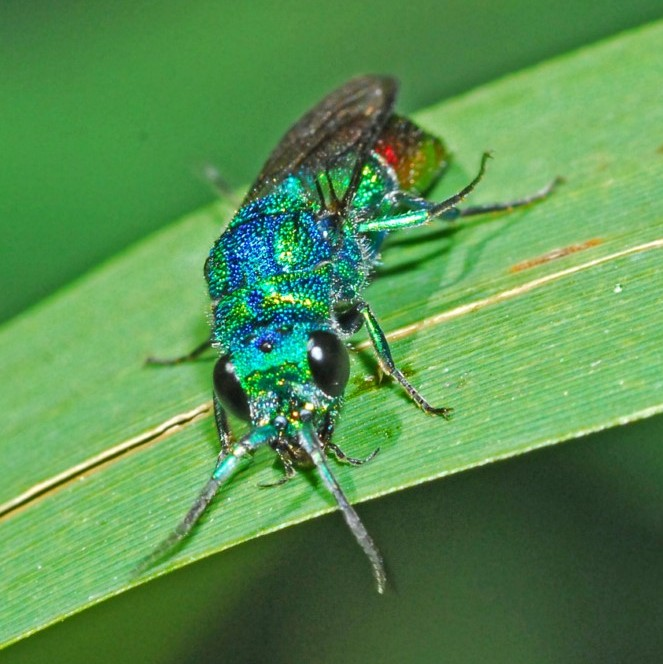
Chrysis fulgida

Video clip

This species has a Palearctic distribution (Europe, Central Asia, China and the Russian Far East).

In Europe it is present in Austria, Belarus, Belgium, Bulgaria, Czech Republic, Denmark, Estonia, Finland, France (including Corsica), Spain, Lithuania, Luxembourg, Latvia, Moldova, Germany, Norway, Poland, Romania, Slovakia, Switzerland, Sweden, Ukraine, Hungary, Great Britain, and Italy (including Sardinia and Sicily).

== Description ==
Chrysis fulgida can reach a body length of about 7–12 mm (0.28–0.47 in) in females, while males can reach about 7–11 mm (0.28–0.43 in). They are brightly colored metallic lustrous cuckoo wasps. Thorax, 1st abdominal tergite, and the head are dark blue or violet-blue; 2nd and 3rd abdominal tergites are golden red. The body is narrow, elongated.

== Biology ==
Flight period extends from May to the end of August. Usually they visit Apiaceae flowers feeding in nectar. They can be found on dead wood (branches and trunks of Populus, Salix, Betula, Quercus) in open biotopes (the edges of forests, clearings, meadows, inland dunes or gardens, in places with dead wood of deciduous trees, often near wooden buildings).

The larvae are nesting parasitoids. They eat larvae of Symmorphus allobrogus, Symmorphus bifasciatus, Symmorphus crassicornis, Symmorphus murarius and possibly Ancistrocerus parietum (Vespidae).
