= Chrysis provancheri =

Scientific classification
- Kingdom: Animalia
- Phylum: Arthropoda
- Class: Insecta
- Order: Hymenoptera
- Family: Chrysididae
- Genus: Chrysis
- Species: C. provancheri

Binomial name
- Chrysis provancheri Schulz, 1906

Species of wasp

Chrysis provancheri is a species of cuckoo wasp in the family Chrysididae.
