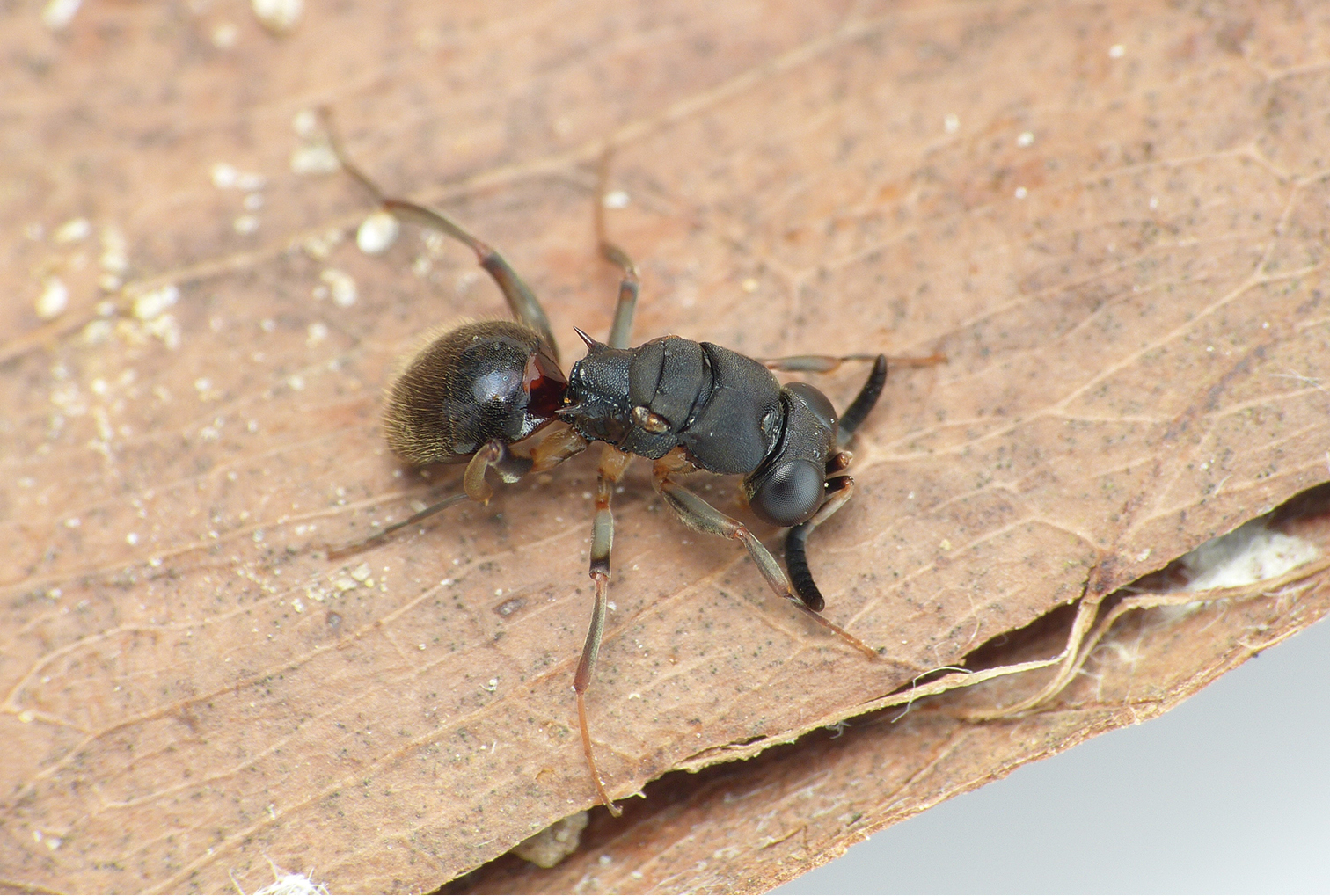
- Mahinda bo

Scientific classification
- Kingdom: Animalia
- Phylum: Arthropoda
- Class: Insecta
- Order: Hymenoptera
- Family: Chrysididae
- Subfamily: Amiseginae; Krombein, 1957

= Amiseginae =

Subfamily of wasps

Amiseginae is a subfamily of cuckoo wasps in the family Chrysididae. There are more than 30 genera and 150 described species in Amiseginae. The group occurs worldwide, and they are parasitoids of stick insect eggs (Phasmatodea). Females of some genera are flightless and resemble ants.

== Genera ==
These 38 genera belong to the subfamily Amiseginae:

- Adelphe Mocsáry, 1890
- Afrosega Krombein, 1983
- Alieniscus Benoit, 1951
- Amisega Cameron, 1888
- Anachrysis Krombein, 1986
- Anadelphe Kimsey, 1987
- Atoposega Krombein, 1957
- Baeosega Krombein, 1983
- Bupon Kimsey, 1986
- Cladobethylus Kieffer, 1922
- Reidia Krombein, 1957
- Colocar Krombein, 1957
- Duckeia Costa Lima, 1936
- Exopapua Krombein, 1957
- Exova Riek, 1955
- Imasega Krombein, 1983
- Indothrix Krombein, 1957
- Isegama Krombein, 1980
- Kryptosega Kimsey, 1986
- Leptosega Krombein, 1984
- Magdalium Kimsey, 1986
- Mahinda Krombein, 1983
- Myrmecomimesis Dalla Torre, 1897
- Nesogyne Krombein, 1957
- Nipponosega Kurzenko & Lelej, 1994
- Noumeasega Kimsey, 2014
- Obenbergerella Strand, 1929
- Perissosega Krombein, 1983
- Rohweria Fouts, 1925
- Saltasega Krombein, 1983
- Senesega Kimsey, 2005
- Serendibula Krombein, 1980
- † Eosega Martynova, 2017
- † Foveorisus Martynova, 2017
- † Palaeobethyloides Brues, 1933
- † Palaeobethylus Brues, 1923
- † Protadelphe Krombein, 1986
- † Protamisega Evans, 1973
