= Chrysis mediata =

Scientific classification
- Domain: Eukaryota
- Kingdom: Animalia
- Phylum: Arthropoda
- Class: Insecta
- Order: Hymenoptera
- Family: Chrysididae
- Subfamily: Chrysidinae
- Tribe: Chrysidini
- Genus: Chrysis
- Species: C. mediata

Binomial name
- Chrysis mediata Linsenmaier,1951

Species of wasp

Chrysis mediata is a Palearctic species of cuckoo wasp.
