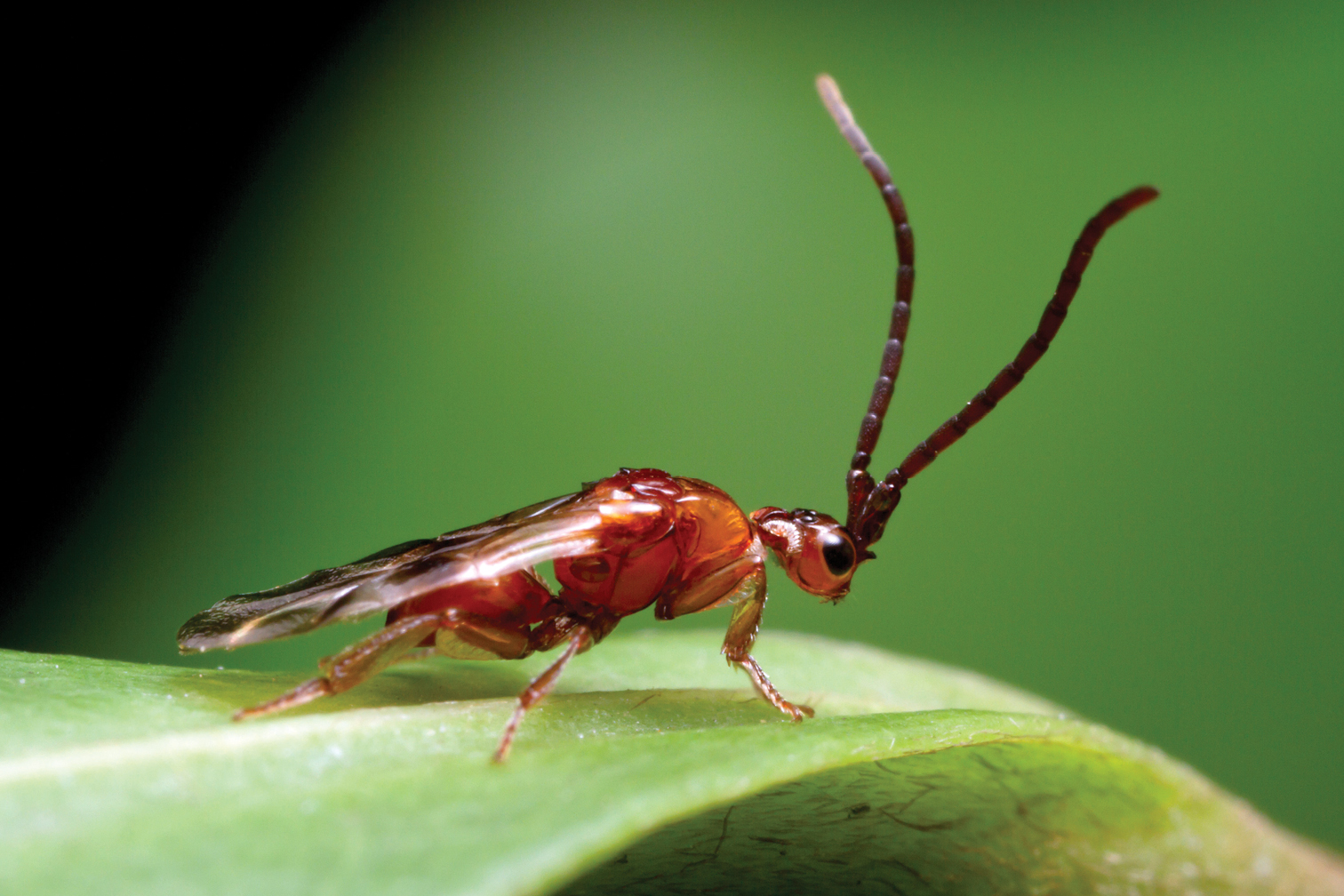
- Loboscelidia, Queensland, Australia

Scientific classification
- Kingdom: Animalia
- Phylum: Arthropoda
- Class: Insecta
- Order: Hymenoptera
- Family: Chrysididae
- Subfamily: Loboscelidiinae; Ashmead, 1903

= Loboscelidiinae =

Subfamily of wasps

Loboscelidiinae is a small subfamily of cuckoo wasps in the family Chrysididae. There are 2 genera and 72 described species in Loboscelidiinae, and they are parasitoids of walking stick eggs.

== Genera ==
- Loboscelidia Westwood, 1874
- Rhadinoscelidia Kimsey, 1988
