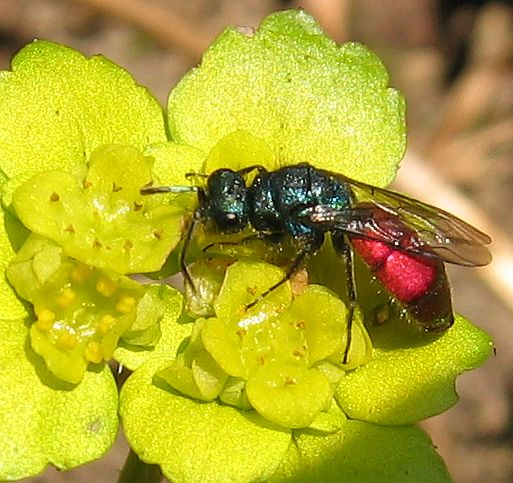
- Chrysis ignita on Chrysosplenium alternifolium

Scientific classification
- Kingdom: Animalia
- Phylum: Arthropoda
- Clade: Pancrustacea
- Class: Insecta
- Order: Hymenoptera
- Family: Chrysididae
- Tribe: Chrysidini
- Genus: Chrysis; Linnaeus, 1761

Type species
- Chrysis ignita Linnaeus, 1758

Subgenera
- Acanthochrysis Haupt, 1956; Cephalochrysis Semenov, 1910; Chrysaspis Saussure, 1887; Chrysidium Brauns, 1928; Chrysis Linnaeus, 1761; Cornuchrysis Balthasar, 1953; Dichrysis Lichtenstein, 1876; Eurychrysis Bischoff, 1910; Glossochrysis Semenov, 1954; Gonodontochrysis Semenov, 1954; Heptachrysis Mocsary, 1889; Heterochrysis Brauns, 1928; Nemophora Dahlbom, 1854; Octochrysis Mocsary, 1914; Platycelia Dahlbom, 1845; Poeciloechroa Dahlbom, 1854; Pseudogonochrysis Bischoff, 1910; Pseudohexachrysis Bischoff, 1910; Pseudotetrachrysis Bischoff, 1910; Pyria Lepeletier & Serville, 1825; Pyrochloris Klug, 1839; Spintharis Klug, 1845

Synonyms
- Chrysogona Förster, 1853; Pyrosoma Dahlbom, 1854 Unav.; Tetrachrysis Lichtenstein, 1876; Hexachrysis Lichtenstein, 1876; Actinochrysis Haupt, 1956; Cymatochrysis Haupt, 1956

= Chrysis (wasp) =

Genus of wasps

Chrysis is a very large genus of cuckoo wasps (insects in the family Chrysididae). It is the largest genus in the family, including over 1,000 species in over 20 subgenera, as speciose as all remaining Chrysididae combined. The generic name is derived from Greek chrysis, "gold vessel, gold-embroidered dress", and pays tribute to the brilliant metallic appearance of wasps in the genus.

== Gallery ==
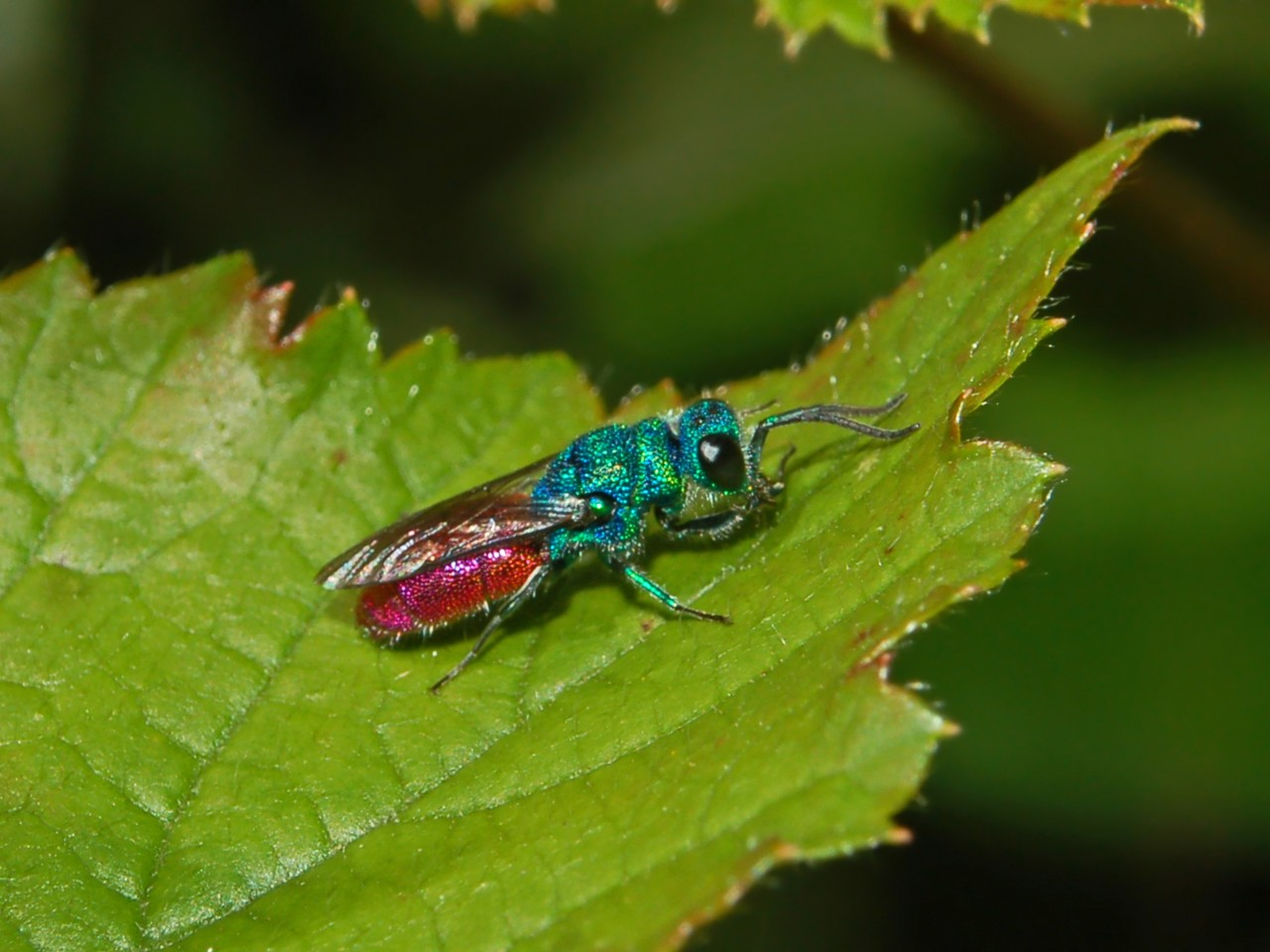
Chrysis inaequalis

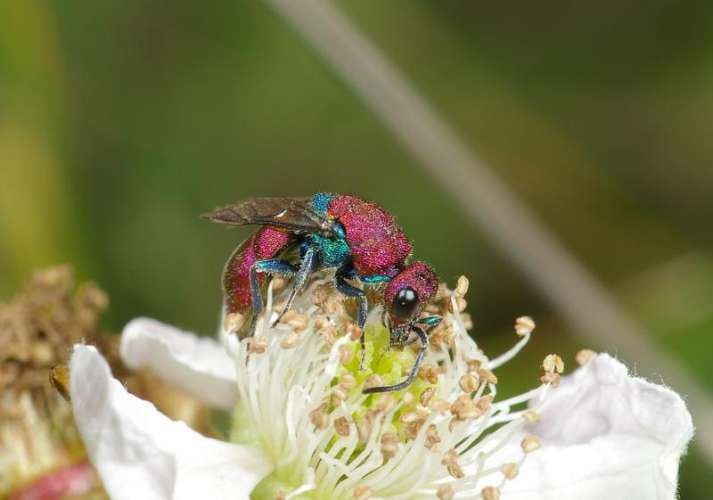
Chrysis cuprea

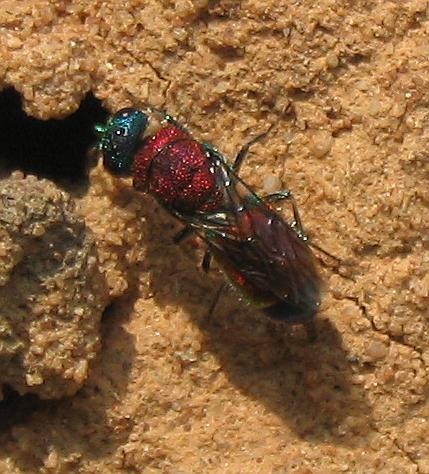
Chrysis viridula

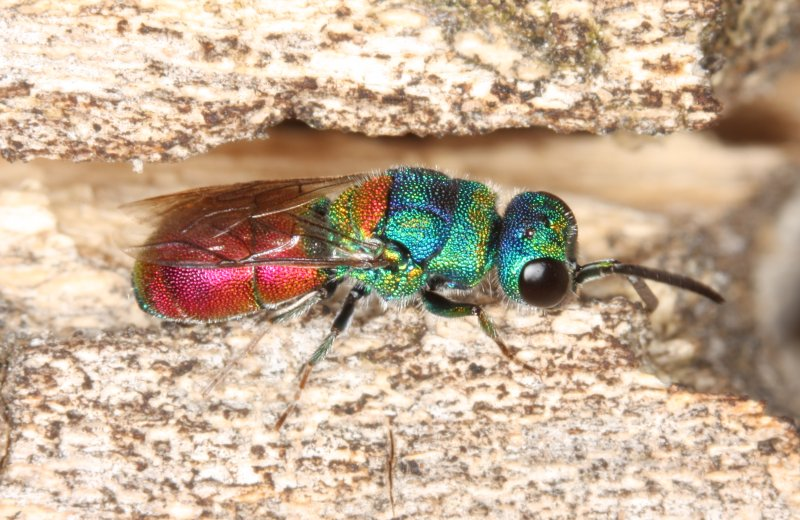
Chrysis scutellaris

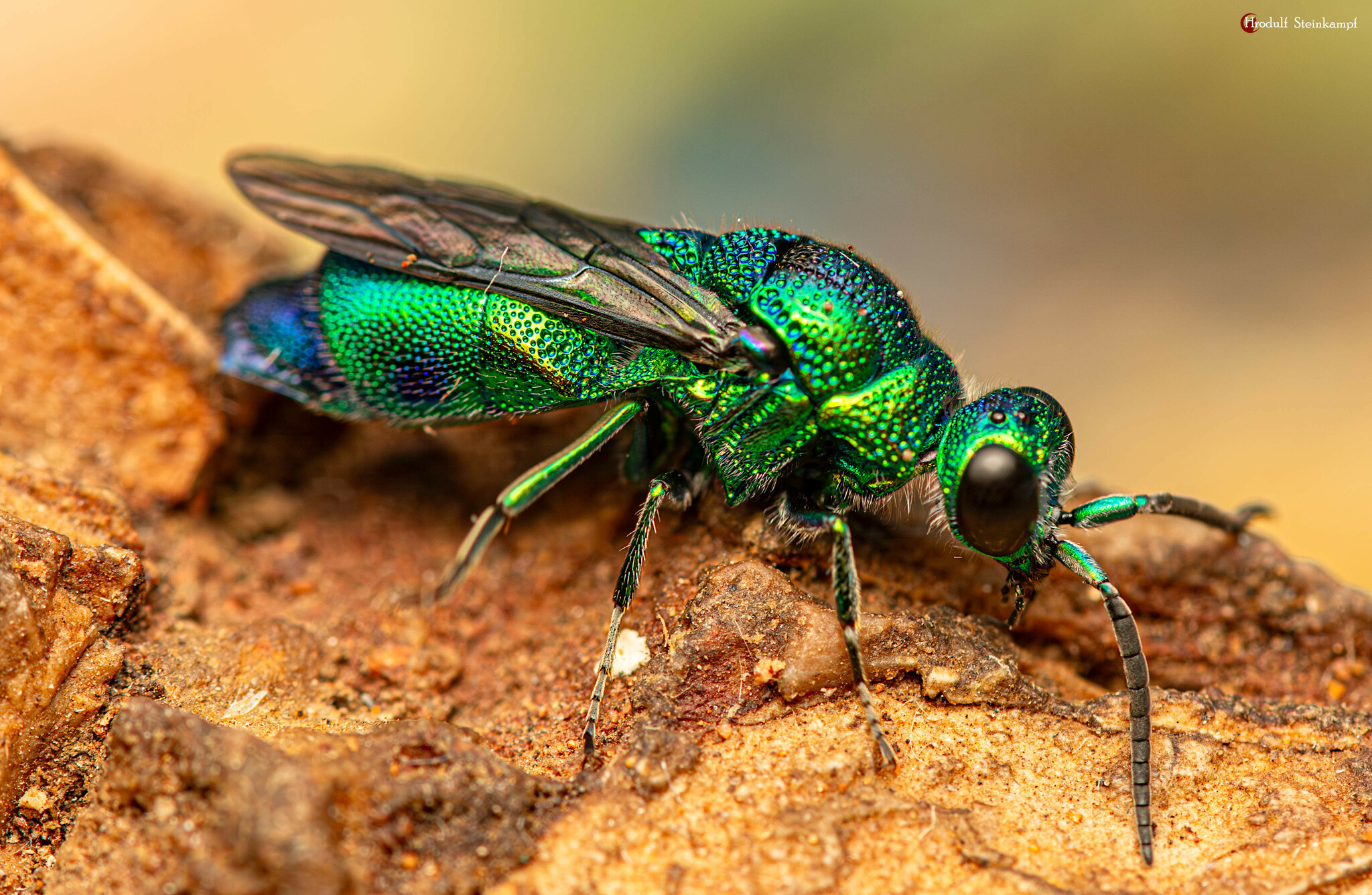
Chrysis lincea

== Selected species ==
- Chrysis adipata Linsenmaier, 1997
- Chrysis aestiva Dahlbom, 1854
- Chrysis agilis Smith, 1874
- Chrysis albanica Trautmann, 1927
- Chrysis amasina Mocsáry, 1889
- Chrysis ambigua Radoszkowski, 1891
- Chrysis analis Spinola, 1808
- Chrysis andradei Linsenmaier, 1959
- Chrysis angolensis Radoszkowski, 1881
- Chrysis angustifrons Abeille de Perrin, 1878
- Chrysis angustula Schenck, 1856
- Chrysis annulata R. du Buysson, 1887
- Chrysis anoma Bohart, 1991
- Chrysis aridula Bohart, 1962
- Chrysis atraclypeata Linsenmaier, 1968
- Chrysis atriventra Linsenmaier, 1968
- Chrysis atrocomitata Linsenmaier, 1993
- Chrysis auriceps Mader, 1936
- Chrysis aurotecta Abeille de Perrin, 1878
- Chrysis ausae Bohart, 1985
- Chrysis australis Bohart, 1985
- Chrysis balearica Linsenmaier, 1968
- Chrysis berlandi Linsenmaier, 1959
- Chrysis bicolor Lepeletier, 1806
- Chrysis bipartita Smith, 1874
- Chrysis blanchardi Lucas, 1849
- Chrysis brevicollis Linsenmaier, 1987
- Chrysis breviradialis Linsenmaier, 1968
- Chrysis brevitarsis Thomson, 1870
- Chrysis bytinskii Linsenmaier, 1959
- Chrysis caeruliventris Abeille de Perrin, 1878
- Chrysis calimorpha Mocsáry, 1882
- Chrysis calpensis R. du Buysson, 1896
- Chrysis canaria Linsenmaier, 1959
- Chrysis caspiensis Linsenmaier, 1959
- Chrysis castiliana Linsenmaier, 1968
- Chrysis castillana R. du Buysson, 1894
- Chrysis cerastes Abeille de Perrin, 1877
- Chrysis cessata R. du Buysson, 1891
- Chrysis chalcea Móczáry, 1965
- Chrysis chinensis Mocsáry, 1912
- Chrysis chlorospila Klug, 1845
- Chrysis chrysoprasina Förster, 1853
- Chrysis chrysoscutalla Linsenmaier, 1959
- Chrysis chrysostigma Mocsáry, 1889
- Chrysis chrysoviolacea Linsenmaier, 1968
- Chrysis cingulicornis Foerster, 1853
- Chrysis clivosa Linsenmaier, 1959
- Chrysis coa Invrea, 1939
- Chrysis coerulans Fabricius, 1805
- Chrysis cohaerea Linsenmaier, 1959
- Chrysis comitata Linsenmaier, 1968
- Chrysis comparata Lepeletier, 1806
- Chrysis comta Förster, 1853
- Chrysis concinna Mocsary, 1902
- Chrysis conica Brulle 1846
- Chrysis consanguinea Mocsáry, 1889
- Chrysis corsica R. du Buysson, 1896
- Chrysis cortii Linsenmaier, 1951
- Chrysis corusca Valkeila, 1971
- Chrysis curtisensis (Linsenmaier, 1982)
- Chrysis cylindrica Eversmann, 1857
- Chrysis cypruscula Linsenmaier, 1959
- Chrysis daphnis Mocsáry, 1889
- Chrysis dentifrontis Linsenmaier, 1982
- Chrysis diacantha Mocsáry, 1889
- Chrysis distincta Mocsáry, 1887
- Chrysis duplogermari Linsenmaier, 1987
- Chrysis dusmetina Bohart, 1991
- Chrysis elegans Lepeletier, 1806
- Chrysis emarginatula Spinola, 1808
- Chrysis equestris Dahlbom, 1845
- Chrysis exsulans Dahlbom, 1854
- Chrysis fasciata Olivier, 1790
- Chrysis festina Smith, 1874
- Chrysis frankenbergeri Balthasar, 1953
- Chrysis friesei R. du Buysson, 1900
- Chrysis frivaldszkyi Mocsáry, 1882
- Chrysis fugax Abeille de Perrin, 1878
- Chrysis fulgida Linnaeus, 1761
- Chrysis fulvicornis Mocsáry, 1889
- Chrysis fuscipennis Brullé, 1846
- Chrysis germari Wesmael, 1839
- Chrysis globuliscutella Linsenmaier, 1993
- Chrysis gracillima Foerster, 1853
- Chrysis graelsii Guérin, 1842
- Chrysis gribodoi Abeille de Perrin, 1877
- Chrysis grohmanni Dahlbom, 1854
- Chrysis handlirschi Mocsáry, 1889
- Chrysis heraklionica Linsenmaier, 1968
- Chrysis hohmanni Linsenmaier, 1993
- Chrysis hydropica Abeille de Perrin, 1878
- Chrysis inaequidens Dahlbom 1854
- Chrysis ignescoa Linsenmaier, 1959
- Chrysis ignicollis (Trautmann, 1926)
- Chrysis ignifacies Mercet, 1904
- Chrysis ignita (Linnaeus, 1758)
- Chrysis illigeri Wesmael, 1839
- Chrysis immaculata R. du Buysson, 1898
- Chrysis impostor Mocsáry, 1887
- Chrysis inaequalis Dahlbom, 1845
- Chrysis inclinata Linsenmaier, 1959
- Chrysis indica Schrank, 1804
- Chrysis insperata Chevrier, 1870
- Chrysis integra Fabricius, 1787
- Chrysis interceptor Smith, 1874
- Chrysis interjecta R. du Buysson, 1895
- Chrysis intrudens Smith, 1865
- Chrysis iris Christ, 1791
- Chrysis irreperta Linsenmaier, 1959
- Chrysis iucunda Mocsáry, 1889
- Chrysis jaxartis Semenov, 1910
- Chrysis judaica R. du Buysson, 1898
- Chrysis kolazyi Mocsáry, 1889
- Chrysis lanceolata Linsenmaier, 1959
- Chrysis larochei Linsenmaier, 1993
- Chrysis leachii Shuckard, 1836
- Chrysis leptomandibularis Niehuis, 2000
- Chrysis lincea Fabricius, 1775
- Chrysis longula Abeille de Perrin, 1879
- Chrysis lucida Linsenmaier, 1951
- Chrysis maderi Linsenmaier, 1959
- Chrysis magnidens Perez, 1895
- Chrysis magnifacialis Linsenmaier, 1993
- Chrysis manicata Dahlbom, 1854
- Chrysis marginata Mocsary, 1889
- Chrysis maroccana Mocsáry, 1883
- Chrysis martinella R. du Buysson, 1900
- Chrysis mavromoustakisi Trautmann, 1929
- Chrysis mediata Linsenmaier, 1951
- Chrysis merceti (Trautmann, 1926)
- Chrysis millenaris Mocsáry, 1897
- Chrysis mirabilis Radoszkowski, 1876
- Chrysis misella R. du Buysson, 1900
- Chrysis mixta Dahlbom, 1854
- Chrysis mutabilis R. du Buysson, 1887
- Chrysis mysticalis Linsenmaier, 1959
- Chrysis nitidula Fabricius, 1775
- Chrysis norsemanae Bohart, 1985
- Chrysis notidana Bohart, 1985
- Chrysis obtusidens Dufour & Perris, 1840
- Chrysis paglianoi Strumia, 1992
- Chrysis parvimediata (Linsenmaier, 1982)
- Chrysis pellucidula Aaron, 1885
- Chrysis peninsularis R. du Buysson, 1887
- Chrysis perexigua Linsenmaier, 1959
- Chrysis perplexa R. du Buysson, 1898
- Chrysis perpulchra Cresson, 1865
- Chrysis perrisi Radoszkowski, 1880
- Chrysis perthensis (Linsenmaier, 1982)
- Chrysis phryne Abeille de Perrin, 1878
- Chrysis placida Mocsáry, 1879
- Chrysis portugalia Linsenmaier, 1959
- Chrysis provancheri Schulz, 1906
- Chrysis provenceana Linsenmaier, 1959
- Chrysis pseudobrevitarsis Linsenmaier, 1951
- Chrysis pseudogribodoi Linsenmaier, 1959
- Chrysis pseudoincisa Balthasar, 1953
- Chrysis pseudoscutellaris Linsenmaier, 1959
- Chrysis pulchella Spinola, 1808
- Chrysis pulcherrima Lepeletier, 1806
- Chrysis pyrophana Dahlbom, 1854
- Chrysis pyrrhina Dahlbom, 1845
- Chrysis ragusae De-Stefani, 1888
- Chrysis ramburi Dahlbom, 1854
- Chrysis rectianalis Linsenmaier, 1968
- Chrysis rubrocoerulea Linsenmaier, 1968
- Chrysis ruddii Shuckard, 1837
- Chrysis rufitarsis Brullé, 1832
- Chrysis rutilans Olivier, 1790
- Chrysis rutiliventris Abeille de Perrin, 1879
- Chrysis saginata Linsenmaier, 1982
- Chrysis schiodtei Dahlbom, 1854
- Chrysis scintillans Valkeila, 1971
- Chrysis sculpturata Mocsáry, 1912
- Chrysis scutellaris Fabricius, 1794
- Chrysis sehestedti Dahlbom, 1854
- Chrysis semicincta Lepeletier, 1806
- Chrysis separata (Trautmann, 1926)
- Chrysis sexdentata Christ, 1791
- Chrysis simplonica Linsenmaier, 1951
- Chrysis simulans Mocsáry, 1889
- Chrysis smaragdula Lepeletier & Serville, 1825
- Chrysis sollicita Mocsáry, 1913
- Chrysis soror Dahlbom, 1854
- Chrysis splendidula Rossi, 1790
- Chrysis subanalis Linsenmaier, 1968
- Chrysis subaurotecta Linsenmaier, 1959
- Chrysis subsinuata Marquet, 1879
- Chrysis succincta Linnaeus, 1767
- Chrysis taczanovskii Radoszkowski, 1876
- Chrysis tasmanica Mocsáry, 1889
- Chrysis taurica Mocsáry, 1889
- Chrysis tridens Linnaeus, 1761
- Chrysis umbofacialis Linsenmaier, 1993
- Chrysis valesiana Frey-Gessner, 1887
- Chrysis valida Mocsáry, 1912
- Chrysis varidens Abeille de Perrin, 1878
- Chrysis verhoeffi Linsenmaier, 1959
- Chrysis verna Dahlbom, 1854
- Chrysis viridula Linnaeus, 1761
- Chrysis westerlundi Linsenmaier, 1959
- Chrysis xysa Bohart, 1985
- Chrysis yallingupia (Linsenmaier, 1982)
- Chrysis zylla Bohart, 1985

== Bibliography ==
- Richards, Owain Westmacott; Davies, R G (1977). "Hymenoptera". Imms' General Textbook of Entomology. Vol. 1: Structure, Physiology and Development (10th ed.). Springer. ISBN 9780412613906.
