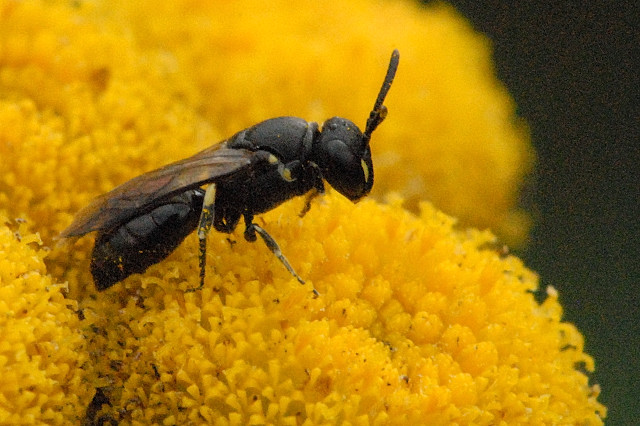
- Hylaeus confusus Ardennes

Scientific classification
- Kingdom: Animalia
- Phylum: Arthropoda
- Clade: Pancrustacea
- Class: Insecta
- Order: Hymenoptera
- Family: Colletidae
- Subfamily: Hylaeinae
- Genus: Hylaeus
- Species: H. confusus

Binomial name
- Hylaeus confusus Nylander, 1852

= Hylaeus confusus =

Species of bee

Hylaeus confusus is a Palearctic species of solitary bee. It is known to nest in reed stalk galls.
