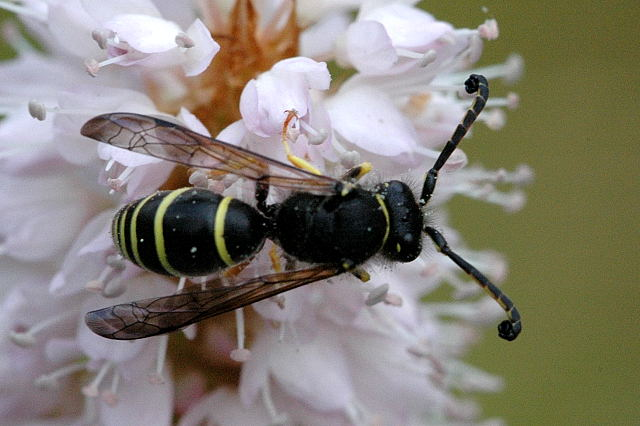
- Odynerus spinipes (Linnaeus)

Scientific classification
- Kingdom: Animalia
- Phylum: Arthropoda
- Class: Insecta
- Order: Hymenoptera
- Family: Vespidae
- Subfamily: Eumeninae
- Genus: Odynerus; Latreille, 1802

Type species
- Vespa spinipes Linnaeus, 1758

= Odynerus =

Genus of wasps

Odynerus is a primarily Holarctic genus of potter wasps.

The name of this genus has been widely used as a root to construct many other genus-level names for potter wasps with non-petiolated metasoma, such as Euodynerus, Acarodynerus, Stenodynerus, Parodontodynerus and Incodynerus.

== Species ==
A partial species list of the hundreds of species classified under Odynerus is set out below:

- Odynerus acuticarinatus (Cameron, 1909)
- Odynerus acutocarinatus Cameron, 1909
- Odynerus areatus Fox, 1902
- Odynerus dorsonotatus Fox, 1902
- Odynerus eburneofasciatus Dusmet, 1903
- Odynerus ezechiae Schulthess, 1923
- Odynerus herbertii Fox, 1902
- Odynerus jeromensis Cameron, 1909
- Odynerus longicornus Fox, 1902
- Odynerus melanocephalus (Gmeling, 1790)
- Odynerus pacator Giordani Soika, 1960
- Odynerus pallidus Zavattari, 1912
- Odynerus rufimaculus Fox, 1902
- Odynerus simillimus Morawitz, 1867
- Odynerus simplex Bingham, 1902
- Odynerus spinipes (Linnaeus, 1758)
- Odynerus striatus (Fox, 1902)
- Odynerus zhelochovtzewi Kostylev, 1929
