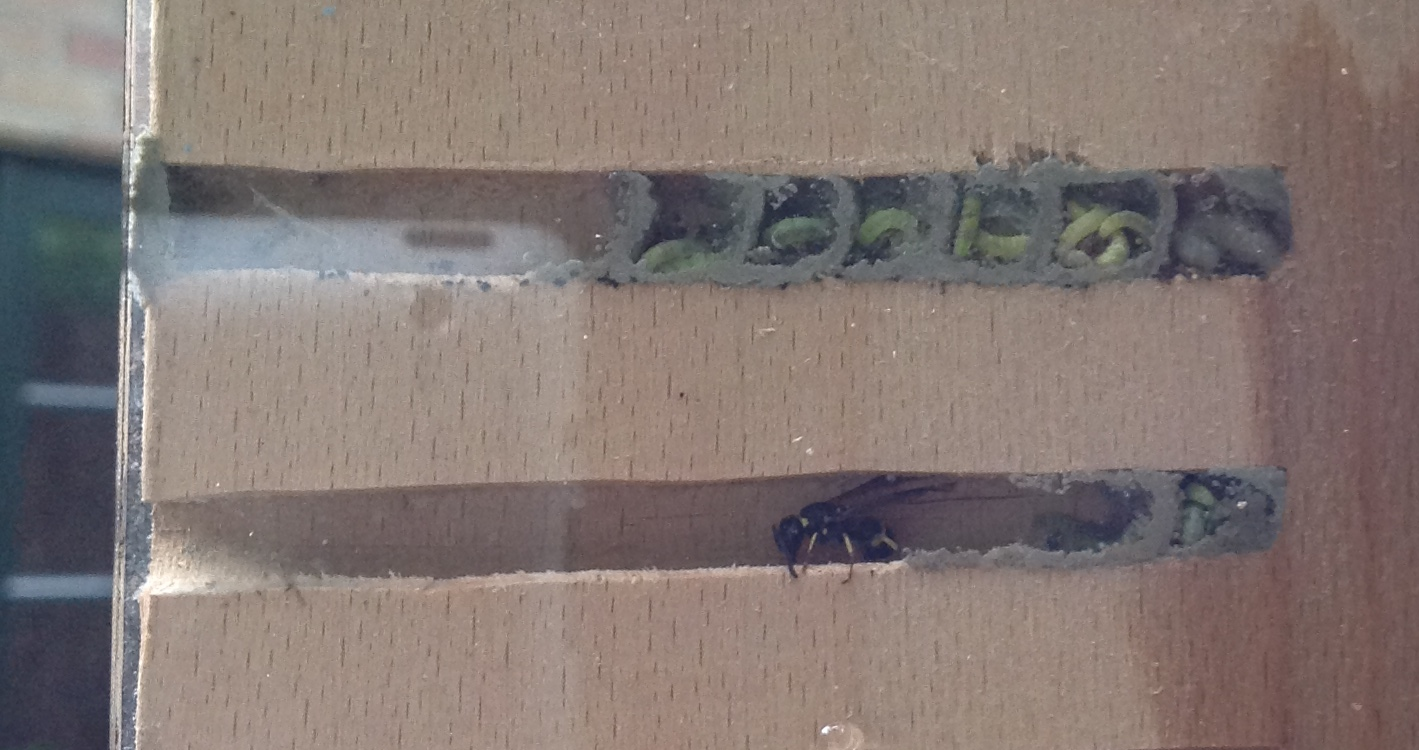

Scientific classification
- Kingdom: Animalia
- Phylum: Arthropoda
- Clade: Pancrustacea
- Class: Insecta
- Order: Hymenoptera
- Family: Vespidae
- Genus: Ancistrocerus
- Species: A. parietum

Binomial name
- Ancistrocerus parietum Linnaeus, 1758

= Ancistrocerus parietum =

Species of insect

Ancistrocerus parietum is a species of insects belonging to the family Vespidae.

It is native to Europe and North America.

== Gallery ==
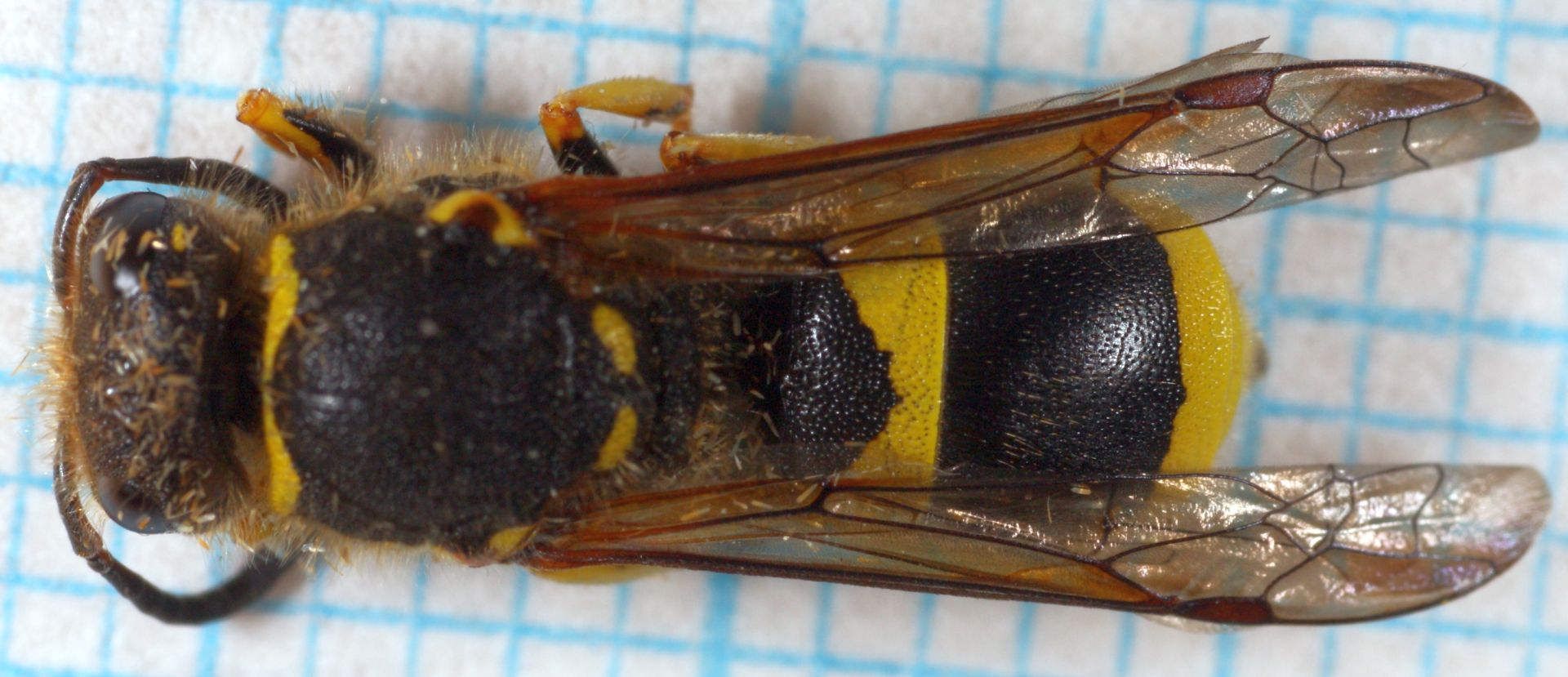
Ancistrocerus parietum color markings on the back

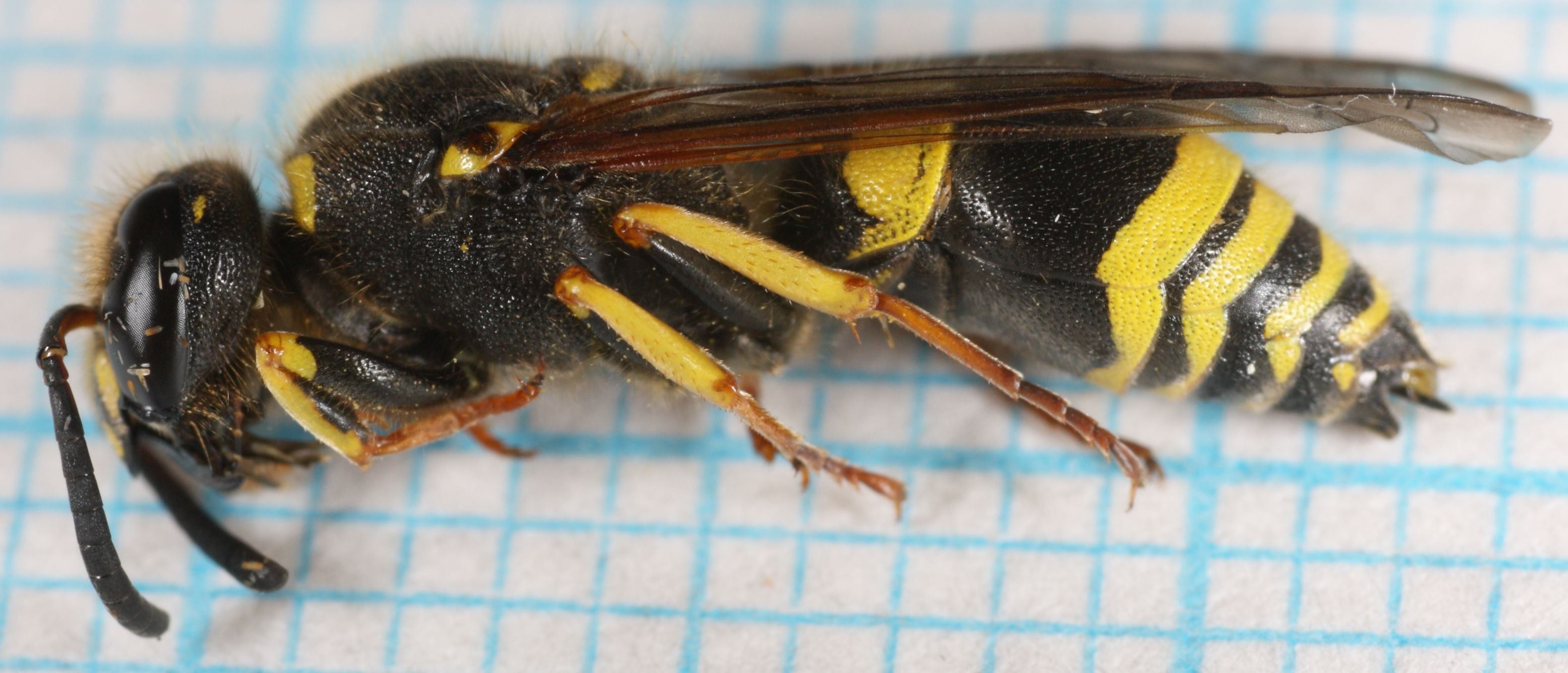
Thighs of Ancistrocerus parietum are almost completely black

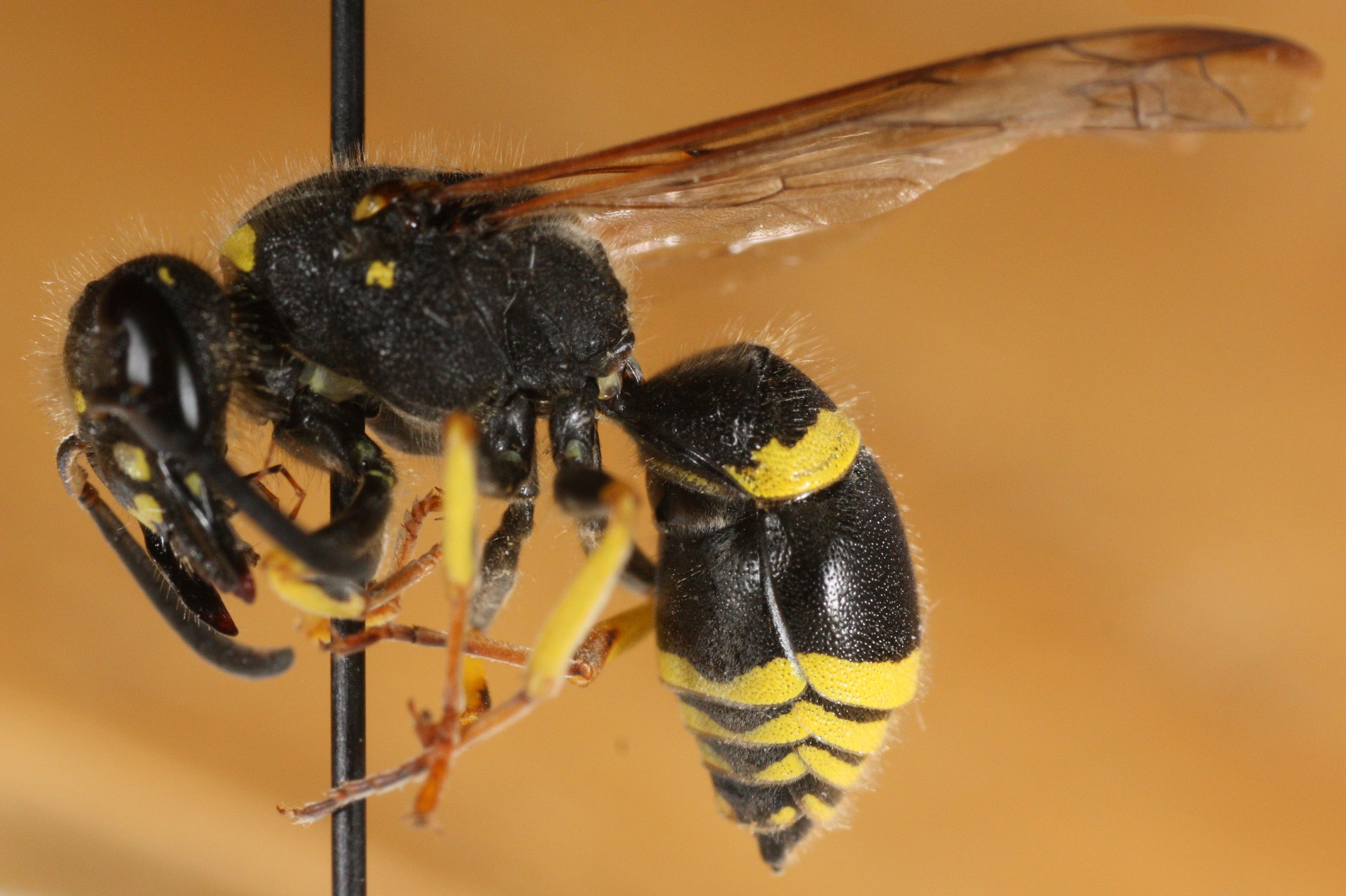
Female of Ancistrocerus parietum has powerful jaws

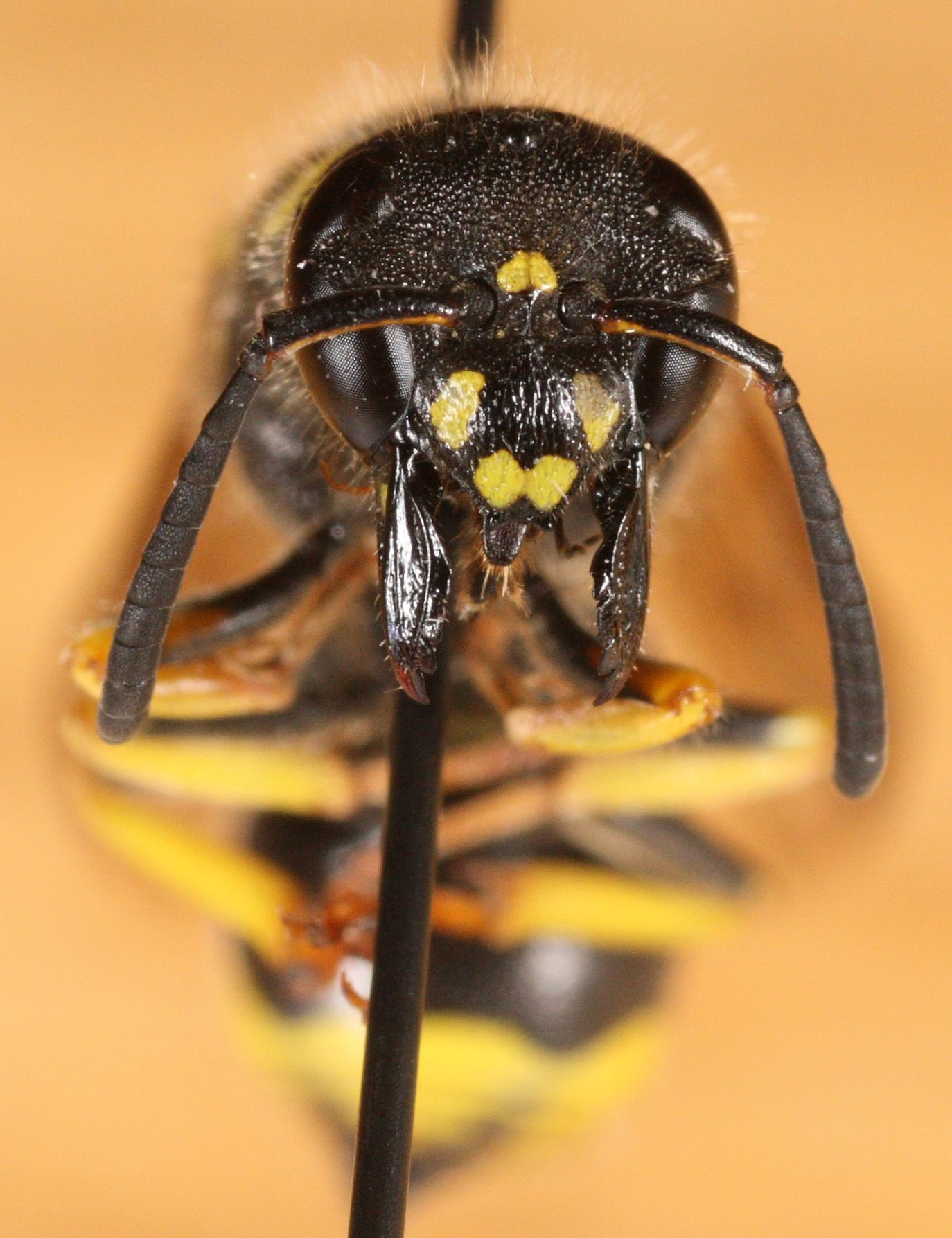
Facial markings of female of Ancistrocerus parietum

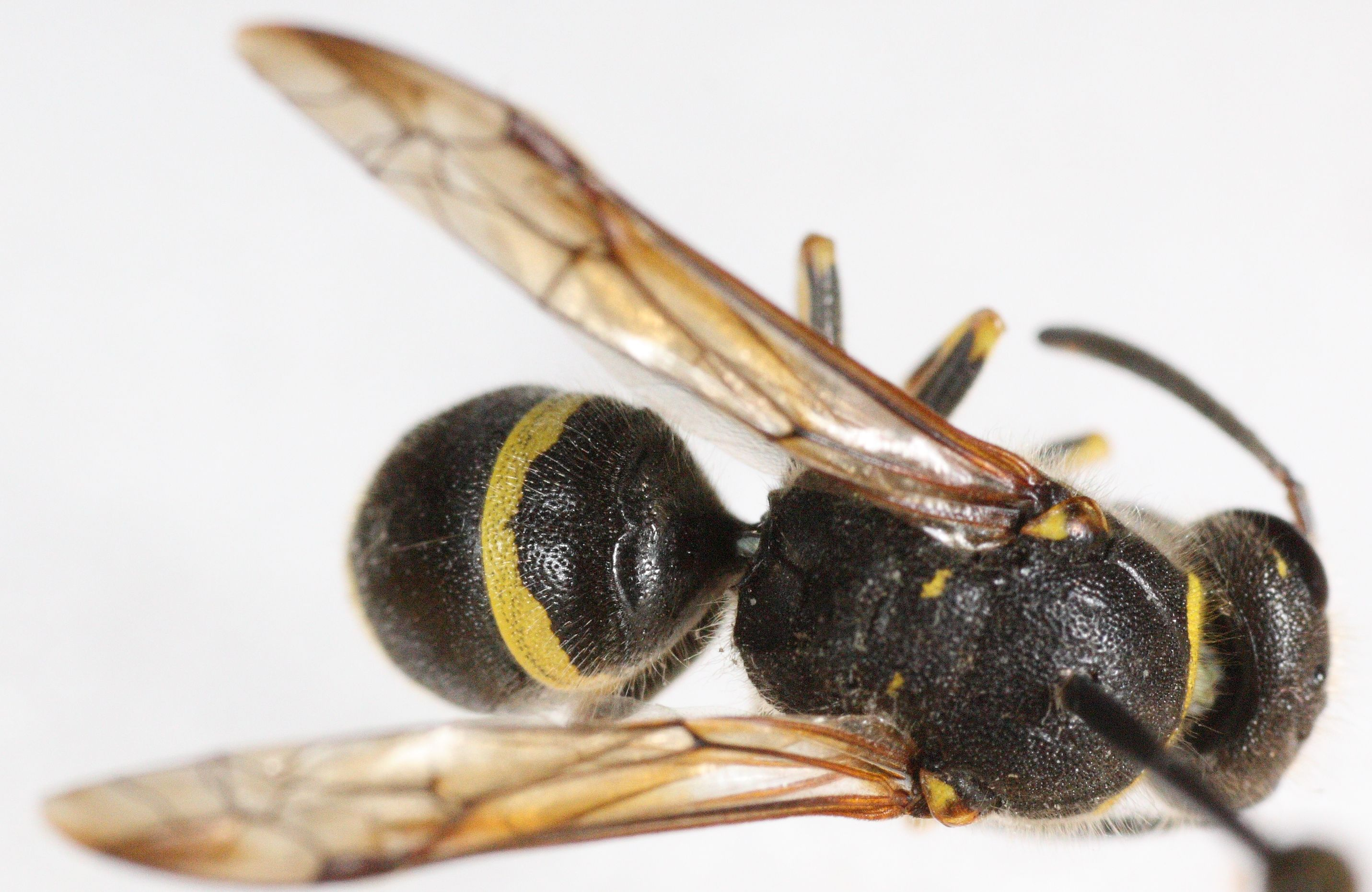
A v-shaped notch in the transverse ridge of the first hind limb of Ancistrocerus parietum is an important characteristic
