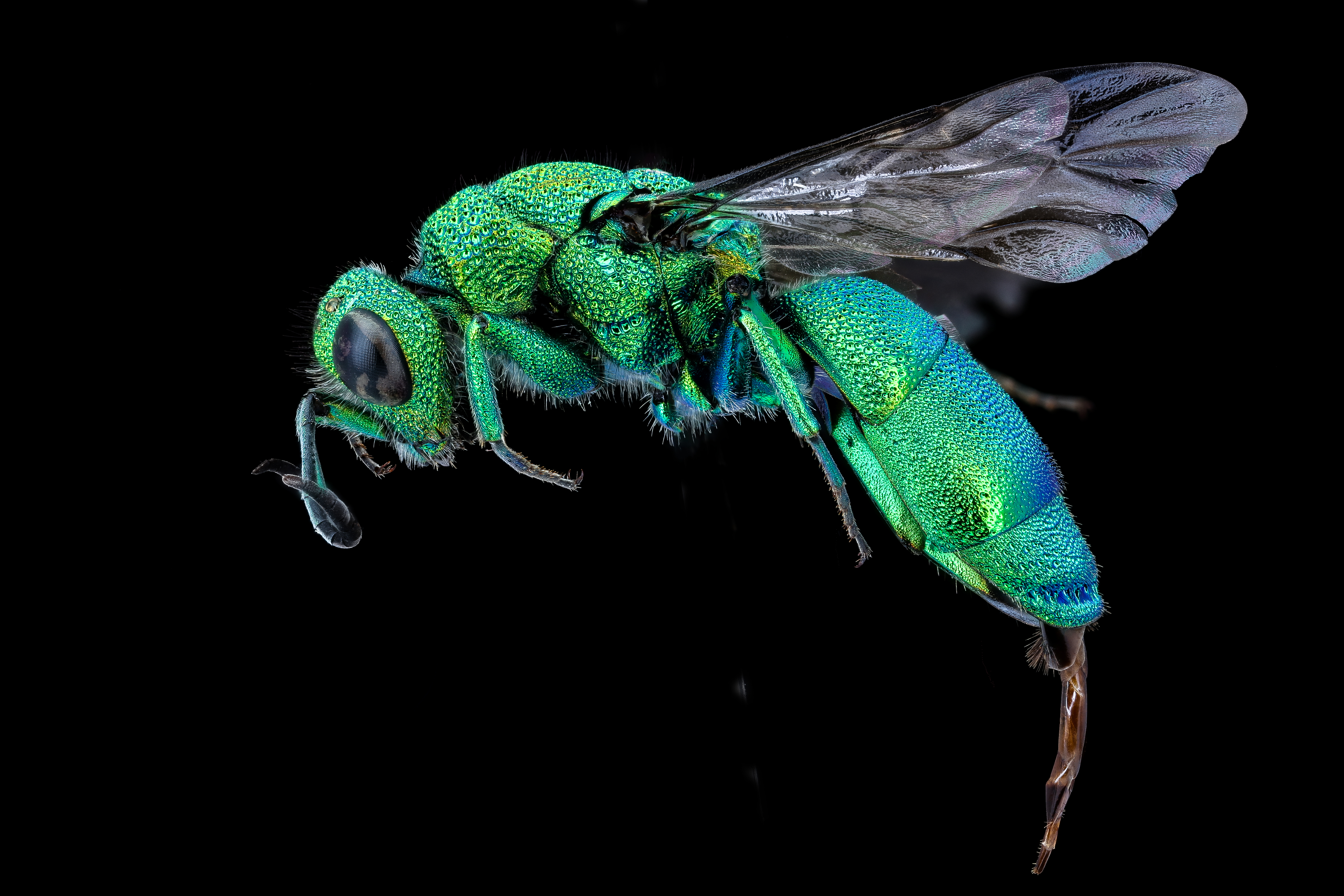

Scientific classification
- Kingdom: Animalia
- Phylum: Arthropoda
- Clade: Pancrustacea
- Class: Insecta
- Order: Hymenoptera
- Superfamily: Chrysidoidea
- Family: Chrysididae; Latreille, 1802

Subfamilies
- Amiseginae; Chrysidinae; Cleptinae; Loboscelidiinae

= Cuckoo wasp =

Cuckoo wasps Temporal range: Aptian–Recent

Family of insects

Commonly referred to as cuckoo wasps or emerald wasps, the hymenopteran family Chrysididae is a very large cosmopolitan group (over 3000 described species) of parasitoid or kleptoparasitic wasps, often highly sculptured, with brilliant metallic colors created by structural coloration. They are most diverse in desert regions of the world, as they are typically associated with solitary bee and wasp species, which are also most diverse in such areas. Their brood parasitic lifestyle has led to the evolution of fascinating adaptations, including chemical mimicry of host odors by some species.

== Nomenclature ==
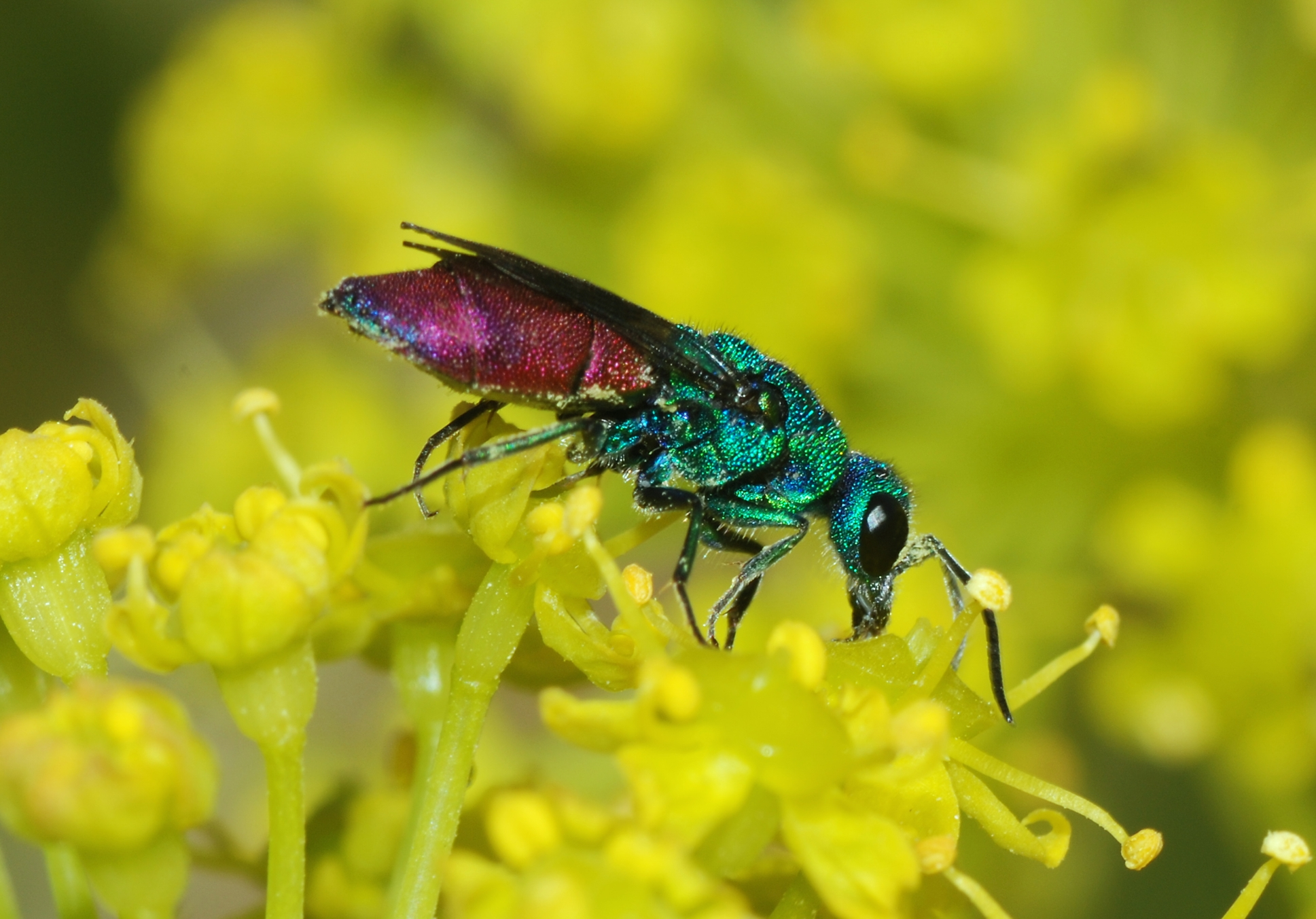
Chrysura refulgens

The term "cuckoo wasp" refers to the cuckoo-like way in which wasps in the family lay eggs in the nests of unrelated host species. The term is also used for some wasps outside of the family, such as Sapyga louisi.

Chrysididae, the scientific name of the family, refers to their shiny bodies and is derived from Greek chrysis, chrysid-, "gold vessel, gold-embroidered dress", plus the familial suffix -idae. The common names of many species pay similar tribute to their appearance: jewel wasp, gold wasp, emerald wasp, ruby wasp and so on (cf. French guêpe de feu, "fire-wasp", and German / Dutch Goldwespe / goudwesp, "gold-wasp").

== Ecology and behavior ==
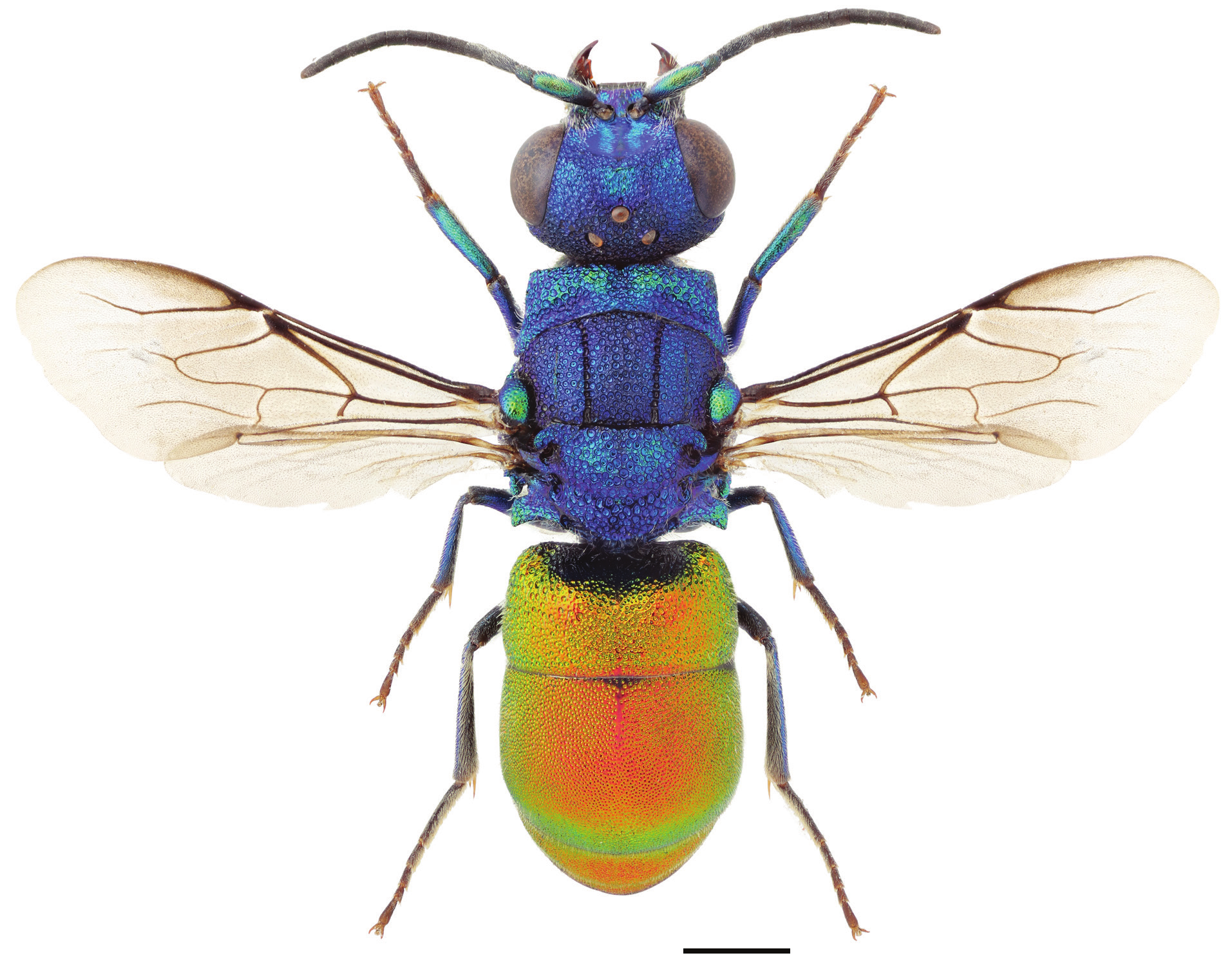
Pseudospinolia neglecta

Members of the largest subfamily, Chrysidinae, are the most familiar; they are generally kleptoparasites, laying their eggs in host nests, where their larvae consume the host egg or larva while it is still young, then the food provided by the host for its own juvenile. Chrysidines are distinguished from the members of other subfamilies in that most have flattened or concave lower abdomens and can curl into a defensive ball ("volvation") when attacked by a potential host, in the manner of a pill bug. Members of the other subfamilies are parasitoids of either sawflies or walking sticks and cannot fold up into a ball.

Chrysidids are always solitary. They fly mainly in the hottest and driest months of summer in subtropical and Mediterranean climates. They favor dry areas and sandy soils; many species are confined to a narrow type of microhabitat where adults may rest or find hosts to parasitize, for example on bare soil or on dead wood where other solitary wasps have their nest holes. Some species visit flowers such as of the Apiaceae, Asteraceae and Euphorbiaceae. Chrysidid wasps are not only known for their parasitic behavior but also for their exceptional resilience to drought conditions, often remaining dormant for extended periods until suitable hosts become available. Some species have also developed specialized body structures, such as reinforced cuticles, to withstand the attacks of their often-aggressive host species.

== Evolution ==
The fossil record of the group is fragmentary, the oldest fossil known being from the lower Aptian Turga Formation of Russia. Other Cretaceous specimens are known from the Albian-Cenomanian amber of France, a Cenomanian limestone in Morocco. The upper Santonian Taimyr amber of Russia and the upper Campanian Canadian amber.
