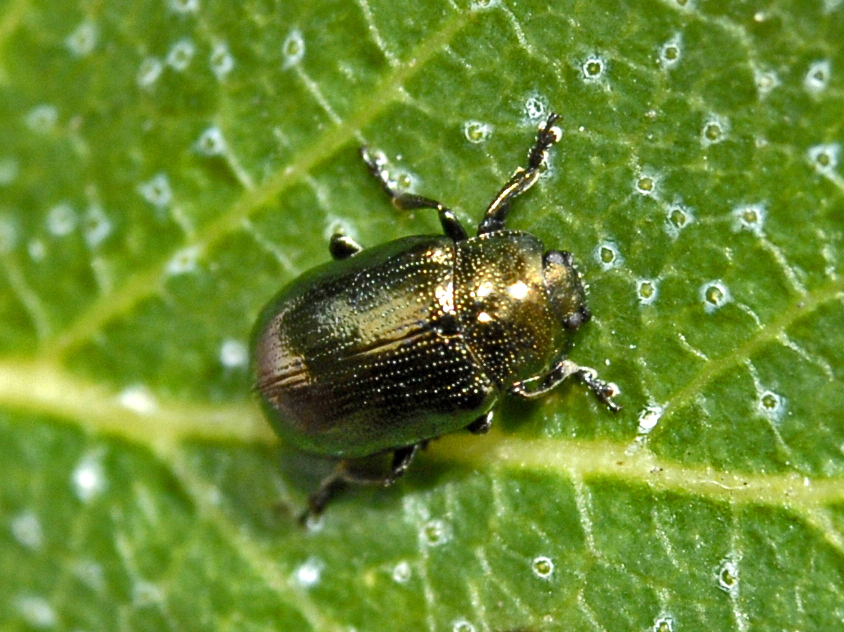
- Phratora vitellinae

Scientific classification
- Kingdom: Animalia
- Phylum: Arthropoda
- Clade: Pancrustacea
- Class: Insecta
- Order: Coleoptera
- Suborder: Polyphaga
- Infraorder: Cucujiformia
- Family: Chrysomelidae
- Subfamily: Chrysomelinae
- Tribe: Chrysomelini
- Genus: Phratora
- Species: P. vitellinae

Binomial name
- Phratora vitellinae (Linnaeus, 1758)

Synonyms
- Chrysomela vitellinae Linnaeus, 1758; Phratora angusticollis Motschulsky, 1860; Phratora latipennis Motschulsky, 1860

= Phratora vitellinae =

Brassy leaf beetle

Species of beetle

Phratora vitellinae, the brassy leaf beetle, formerly Phyllodecta vitellinae, is a beetle of the family Chrysomelidae found in Europe and Asia. It feeds on Populus and Salix species. The evolution of its host plant preferences and the mechanism by which it uses host plant chemicals to make a larval defensive secretion have been the subject of intense study by research groups in Europe and the Nordic countries.

== Description ==
Phratora vitellinae adults range from 3.5–5.2 mm long. The opaque forewings (elytra) show longitudinal rows of clearly visible dots. Adults typically show metallic blue, green, or bronze colors. Adults show copper or purple colors at high elevations or in Arctic regions. One way to distinguish among adult Phratora beetles co-occurring on the same host plant is to gently squeeze the abdomen of females until the morphology of the genitalia can be observed from the ventral side. Phratora vitellinae females possess a wide smooth sclerotized plate running parallel to the posterior of the abdomen.

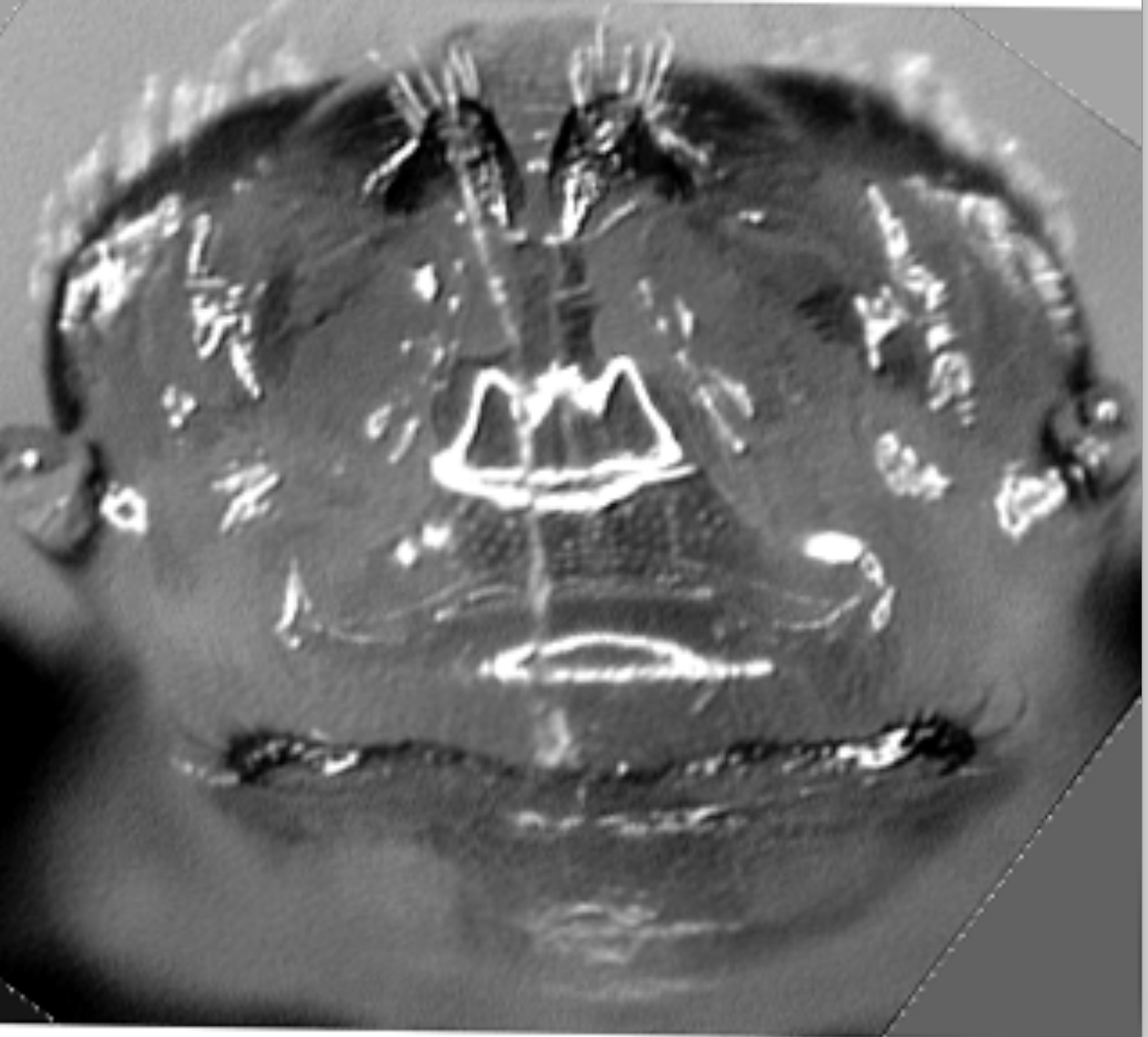
Genitalia of female Phratora vitellinae viewed from ventral side

Eggs are typically laid in clutches of 8–16, arranged in rows on the underside of the host leaf. Like other Phratora species, eggs are partially covered with a crusty secretion. Eggs are about 0.8–1.0 mm long and 0.4–0.5mm wide. Larvae feed in groups in early instars (molts).

Phratora vitellinae beetles feeding on Populus may co-occur with two other Phratora species Phratora laticollis and Phratora atrovirens. The Brassy Willow Beetle is larger and more abundant than P. atrovirens and somewhat broader in body shape than P. laticollis. Phratora vitellinae populations on Salix purpurea sometimes co-occur with Phratora tibialis, which also has a thinner body than P. vitellinae.

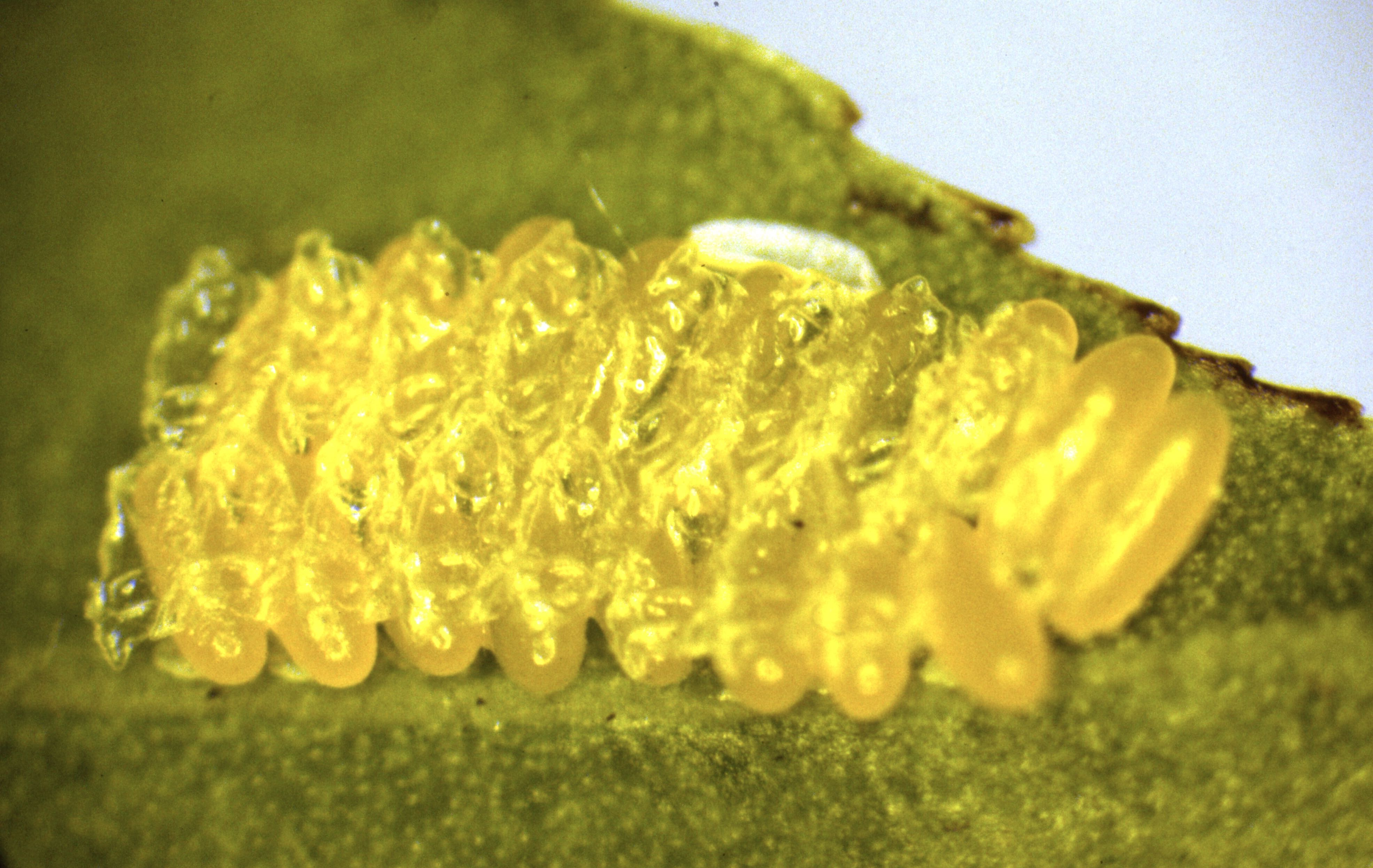
Egg of Parasyrphus nigritarsus (top, pale) on egg clutch of Phratora vitellinae (yellow). The crusty secretion on top of the beetle eggs is evident.

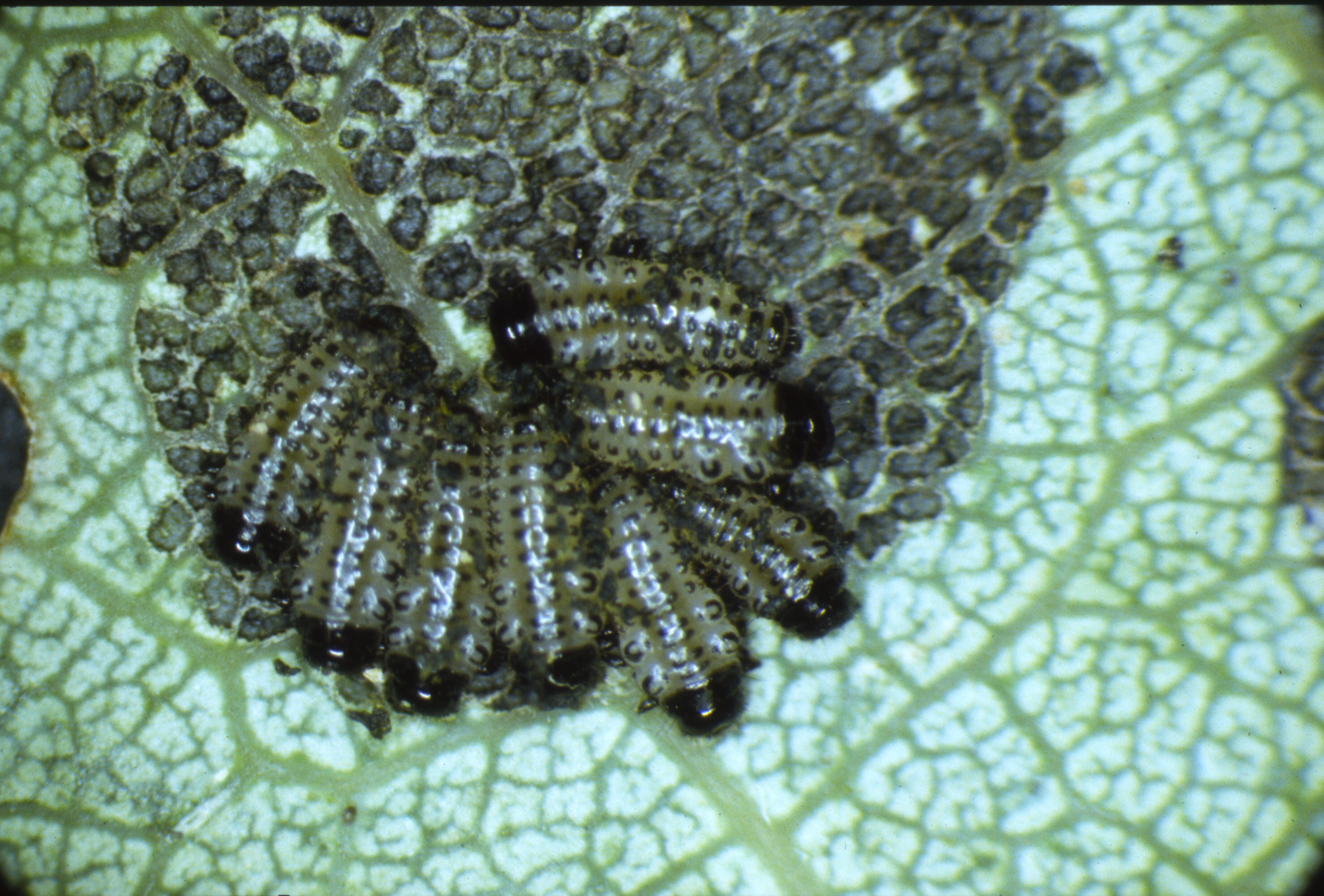
Phratora vitellinae larvae feeding on Populus tremula

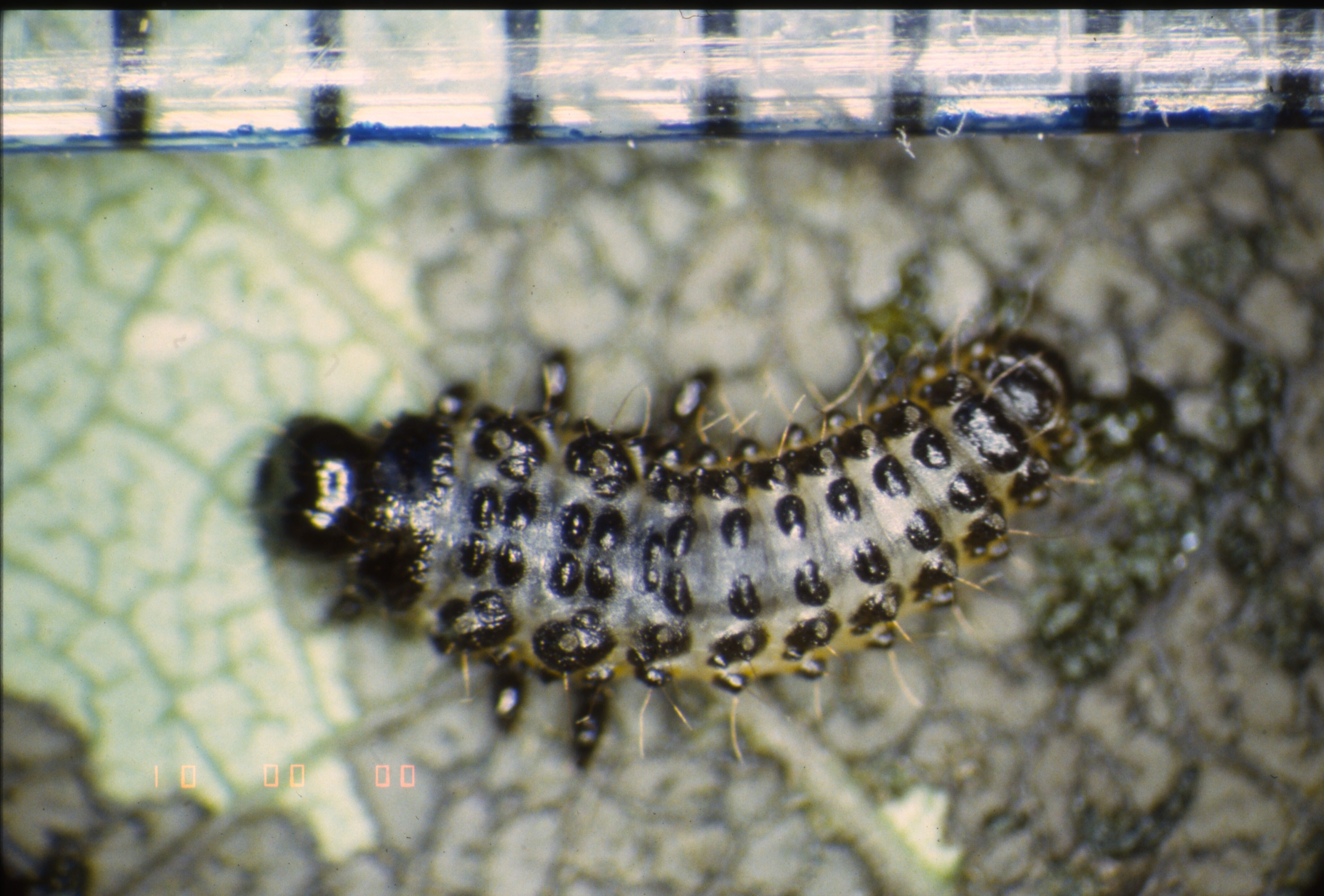
Third instar P. vitellinae larva feeding on a willow leaf

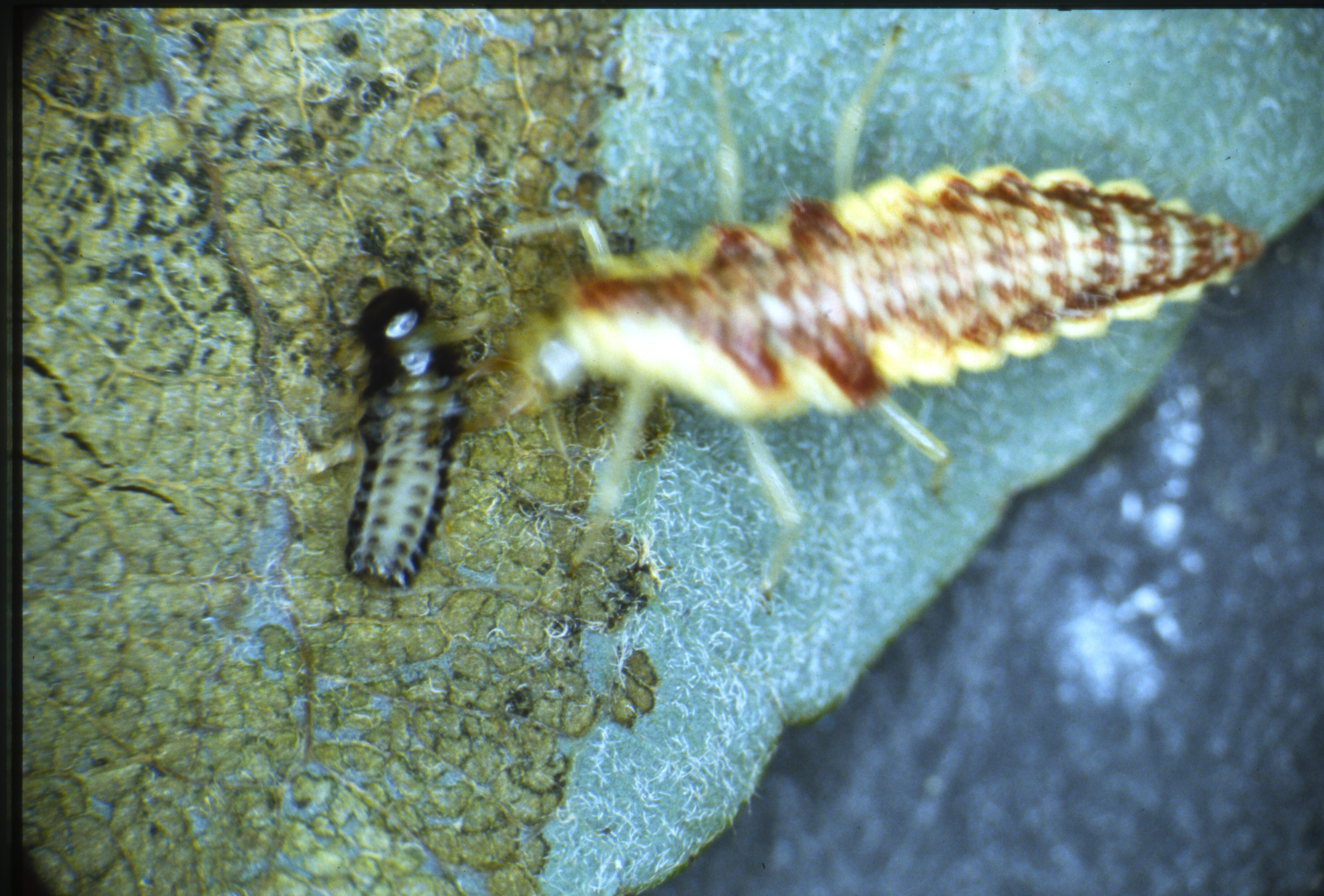
Lacewing larva eating second instar Phratora vitellinae larva

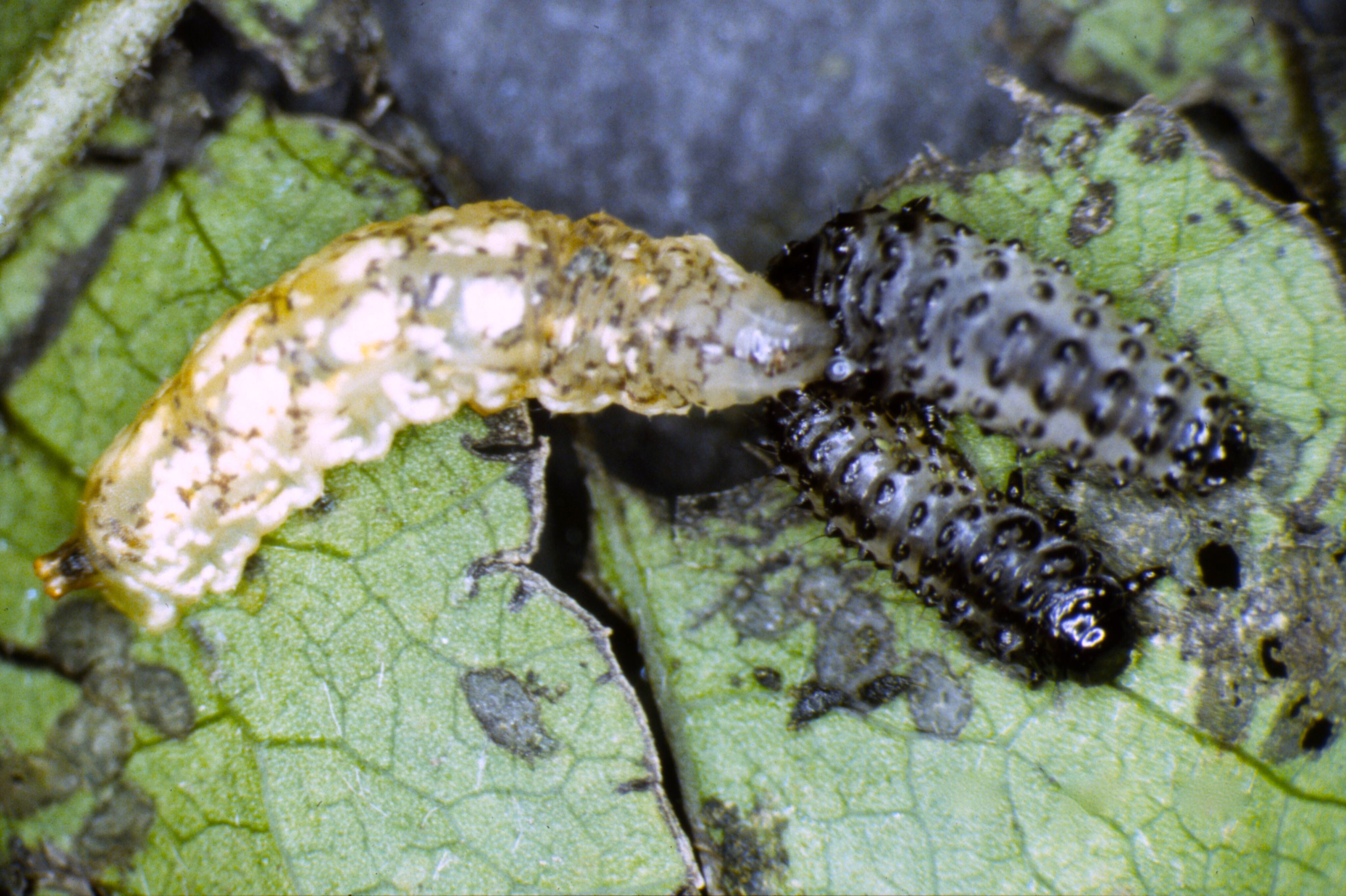
Parasyrphus nigritarsus eating Phratora vitellinae

== Range ==
Phratora vitellinae is a wide spread species in Eurasia. In Europe, it is found in Arctic regions and the Nordic countries, the United Kingdom, Germany to Spain, Serbia and Bosnia. It is also found in China and elsewhere in Asia. Populations occur at high elevations in parts of central Europe and China. Phratora vitellinae was introduced to Iceland in 2005 and is considered an invasive species there.

== Host plants and habitats ==
Phratora vitellinae adults feed and lay eggs on aspen and willow (Salix) trees, including Populus tremula, Salix borealis, Salix myrsinifolia (also known as Salix nigricans, and a closely related willow Salix hegetschweileri),Salix purpurea, Salix pentandra, Salix eleagnos, Salix euxina (syn. S. fragilis), Salix viminalis, Populus balsamifera, and Populus nigra.

They may be found on other hosts, including cultivars of Populus species, in plantations. Their larvae develop on the same host plants as adults. The Brassy willow beetle is typically found in moist habitats, which are where their host plants thrive. These include bogs, forests, hedge rows and creek or river banks.

Phratora vitellinae is exceptional within Phratora in that it consumes Populus and salicylate-rich willows, giving it a relatively broad host plant range. Its broad diet breadth appears to relate to its ability to sequester host plant salicin and related compounds to produce a larval defensive secretion that mostly consists of salicylaldehyde derived from the host plant.

== Life history ==
Urban (2006) described the life history of a population in the Czech Republic in detail, and his article contains a good review of older studies of P vitellinae natural history and host plant use. Like other Phratora species, P vitellinae adults overwinter under bark, within fissures of bark of trees found near summer host plants, or in leaf litter. In spring, after 8–10 months overwintering, adults disperse to host plants and consume new foliage for about a week before mating, and in another week they lay their eggs on the underside of basal leaves on basal shoots. They lay 200–500 eggs in small clutches for up to 8 weeks during the growing season.

After 8–14 days, hatchlings emerge from eggs and begin to feed on the host plant, often forming a row of feeding larvae. Larvae grow for about 8–20 days and undergo two molts before they reach the pupal stage. Before pupating, they migrate to the soil near host plants and make a pupal chamber. They remain in the pupal chamber for about eight days before emerging as new adults. In central Europe, this species can experience multiple generations per growing season (multivoltine), but it undergoes only one generation per summer in the Nordic countries or at high elevations.

== Natural enemies ==
Adults may be consumed by predatory insects or birds, and they may succumb to infection by the fungus Beauveria bassiana or nematodes. Eggs of P vitellinae are consumed by the syrphid fly Parasyrphus nigritarsis and probably are eaten by predaceous bugs and mites. Kanervo (1939) studied feeding behavior of ladybird beetles and found that some prefer leaf beetle prey over aphids. He found that Calvia quindecimguttata consumed P vitellinae eggs. Rank et al (1998) observed natural enemies of P vitellinae eggs and larvae in eastern Finland and found that the most common predators were P. nigritarsis, the bug Anthocorus nemorum, and a lacewing (Chrysopidae) larva. Rowell-Rahier (1984) observed anthocorid bugs, lacewing larvae, spiders, and a predacious sawfly Tenthredo olivacea consuming larvae at a locality in eastern France. The bug Rhacognathus punctatus consumes eggs, larvae, and adult beetles. Larvae are parasitized by Meigenia mutabilis, a tachinid fly The wasp Symmorphus bifasciatus feeds on larvae of Phratora species, including P. vitellinae. Some of these enemies appear to be attracted to leaf beetle secretions.

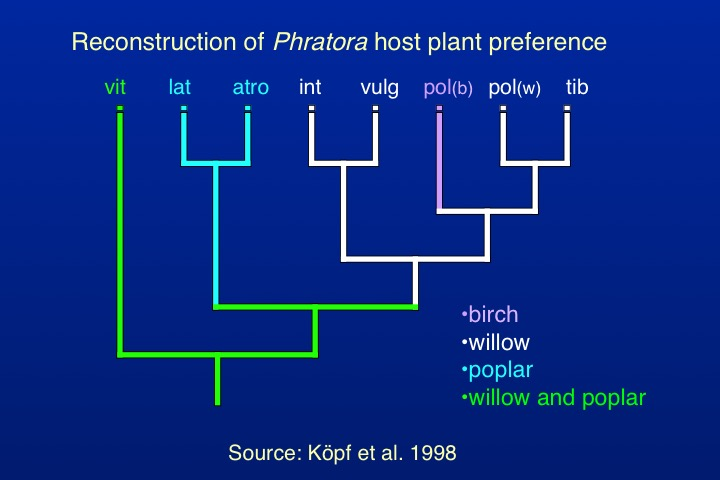
Evolution of host plant use in Phratora, based on a phylogeny of mostly European species.

== Taxonomy ==
Classification of species within Phratora has been investigated by reconstructing a phylogenetic tree of evolutionary relationships among mostly European species, which allowed for a reconstruction of host plant preference within the genus. Phratora vitellinae is the most closely related species to the outgroup taxa, which are relatives within the Chrysomelini lineage within the subfamily Chrysomelinae. More recent studies have included mitochondrial sequences from additional North American species (cf. Figure 2 in Canty et al. 2019), and they are consistent with the position of P. vitellinae in the phylogeny of European species published by Köpf et al. (1998). Most Phratora species either specialize on willow or poplar, while P. vitellinae feeds on several host plants in both genera, and one interpretation of this pattern is that there is an evolutionary trend towards greater host plant specialization in Phratora. Another possibility is that the evolution of sequestration of host plant salicylates into the beetle's defensive secretion also allowed them to metabolize a variety of host plant chemicals more effectively and caused them to adopt a broader diet. A more comprehensive phylogeny that includes North American and Asian species might help distinguish among these hypotheses.

== Larval secretion chemistry ==
Phratora vitellinae sequesters host plant salicylates to make its larval defensive secretion. This is a unique derived trait in the genus Phratora. Most Phratora species possess the ancestral trait of synthesizing iridoid monoterpene larval defensive secretions themselves (autogeneously), independent of the secondary chemistry of the host plant. Although use of host plant compounds to make larval defensive secretions appears to be the evolutionarily advanced state of this trait, other Phratora species (e.g. P. laticollis) already possess precursor mechanisms to transport plant secondary compounds, that were evidently further modified in P. vitellinae to sequester those compounds.

== Ecological experiments on host plant use ==
As noted above, P. vitellinae is widespread and common and has an unusual mechanism for metabolizing host plant secondary compounds to make its own defensive secretion. Researchers have been interested in host plant chemistry and how it relates to the suitability of potential hosts for the diet of P. vitellinae for decades. They have also studied the effects of its host-derived defensive secretion on natural enemies, and these studies have often concentrated on generalist predators that are relatively easy to use in laboratory feeding trials. A summary of representative host plant and laboratory predator studies follows.

Rowell-Rahier (1984) published companion studies of field observations of P. vitellinae on different host plants in eastern France and laboratory tests of P. vitellinae feeding preferences. She found that salicylate-rich willows and poplars were favored over the salicylate-poor willows Salix caprea and Salix cinerea. Both of the salicylate poor species have dense hairs or trichomes on the undersides of their leaves, which might repel P. vitellinae. On the other hand, these hosts are favored and frequently used by Phratora vulgatissima, which suggests that the beetles can overcome the potential physical defense of leaf trichomes.

Tahvanainen et al. (1985) published a study of host plant preferences among native and introduced Finnish willows that varied in phenolglycoside chemistry for four species of leaf beetles occurring in Finland, including P. vitellinae. The native species included the salicylate-rich Salix myrsinifolia and Salix pentandra and the salicylate-poor Salix phylicifolia and Salix caprea and the introduced species included Salix cv. aquatica, Salix dasyclados, Salix triandra, and Salix viminalis. Overall, P. vitellinae preferred the willow species rich in salicylates over the other species, while the other leaf beetles tended to favor the salicylate-poor willows. The researchers considered leaf texture to be a less important trait for the beetle than the chemistry of the host leaves. They also noted that Salix pentandra was relatively unpalatable, possibly because it contained high levels of a phenolglycoside not found in the other willows.

Denno et al. (1990) hypothesized that the host plant use of P. vitellinae would be based on levels of salicylates in the leaves and that higher predation from natural enemies on salicylate-poor plants would generate a selection pressure favoring leaf beetle specialization on willows with higher salicylates. They evaluated preference and performance among three willows: Salix dasyclados (salicylate-rich, dense trichomes), Salix euxina (syn. S. fragilis), (salicylate-rich, sparse trichomes), and Salix viminalis (salicylate-poor, dense trichomes). They also evaluated the suitability of these host plants to another beetle Galerucella lineola that does not use host plant compounds to produce a larval defensive secretion. Their results showed that P. vitellinae preferred, performed, and survived better on S. euxina over the other two hosts, suggesting that host plant salicylates play a role in its host preference but also demonstrating that other factors might favor P. vitellinae avoidance of some salicylate-rich plants.

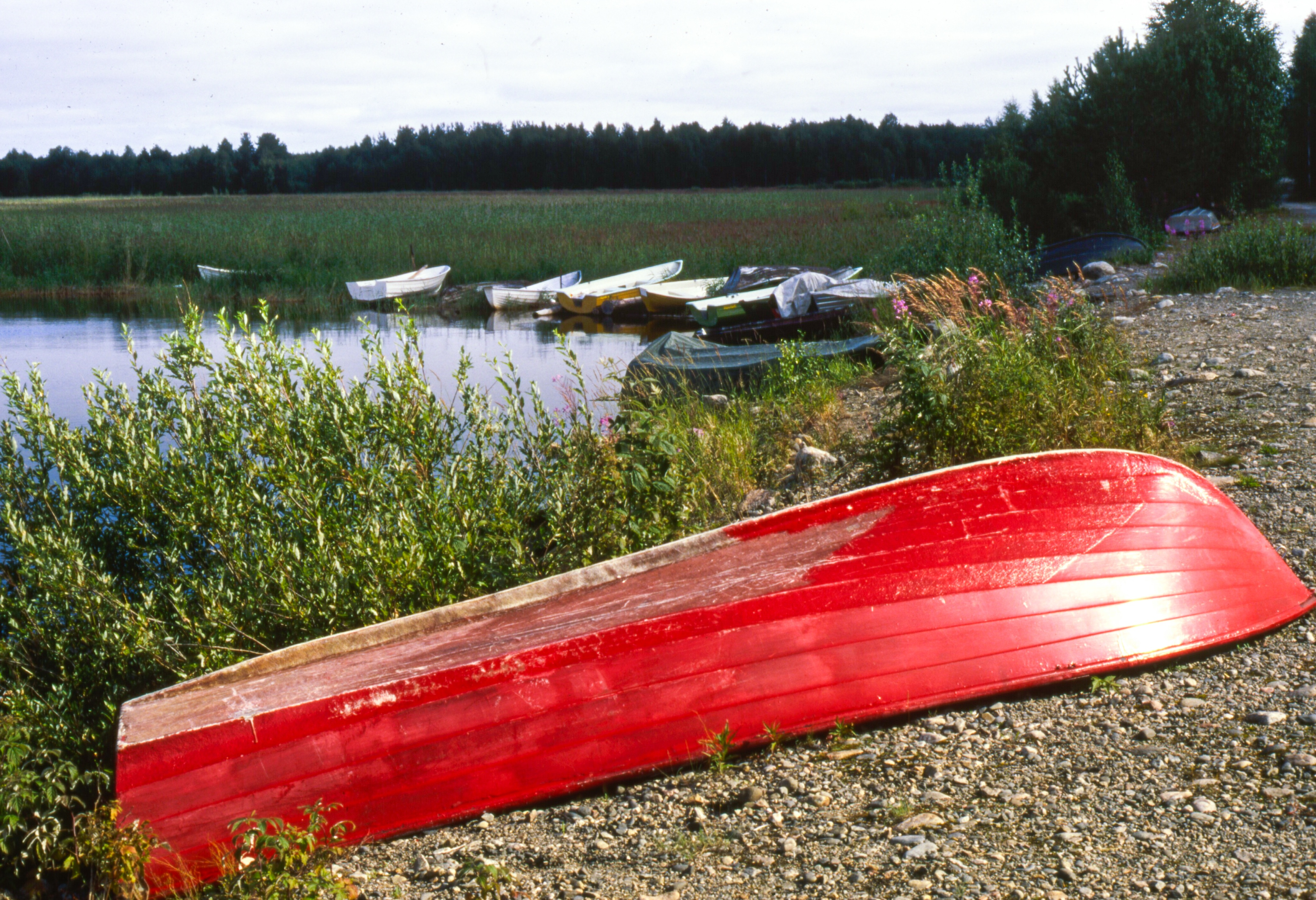
Höytiäinen Canal in eastern Finland where Phratora vitellinae survival was measured

Rank et al. (1998) focused on host preference and performance among three co-occurring Finnish willow species that were among the native willows investigated by Tahvanainen et al. (1985): salicylate-rich Salix myrsinifolia and Salix pentandra and the salicylate-poor Salix phylicifolia, and they measured larval survival on all three host species in the wild in the presence of natural predators. Their results showed that beetle larvae can develop and survive on all three willows, but adults strongly preferred the salicylate-rich willows over Salix phylicifolia and the larvae developed more rapidly on them. Larvae produced the largest amount of defensive secretion on Salix pentandra, which contains the highest levels of salicylates, but they developed more slowly and survived more poorly on S. pentandra than Salix myrsinifolia. Results supported the findings of Kohlemainen et al (1995) that revealed that P. vitellinae is stimulated to feed by salicylates and extracts of them, but salicylates found in S. pentandra may be more difficult for the beetles to metabolize.

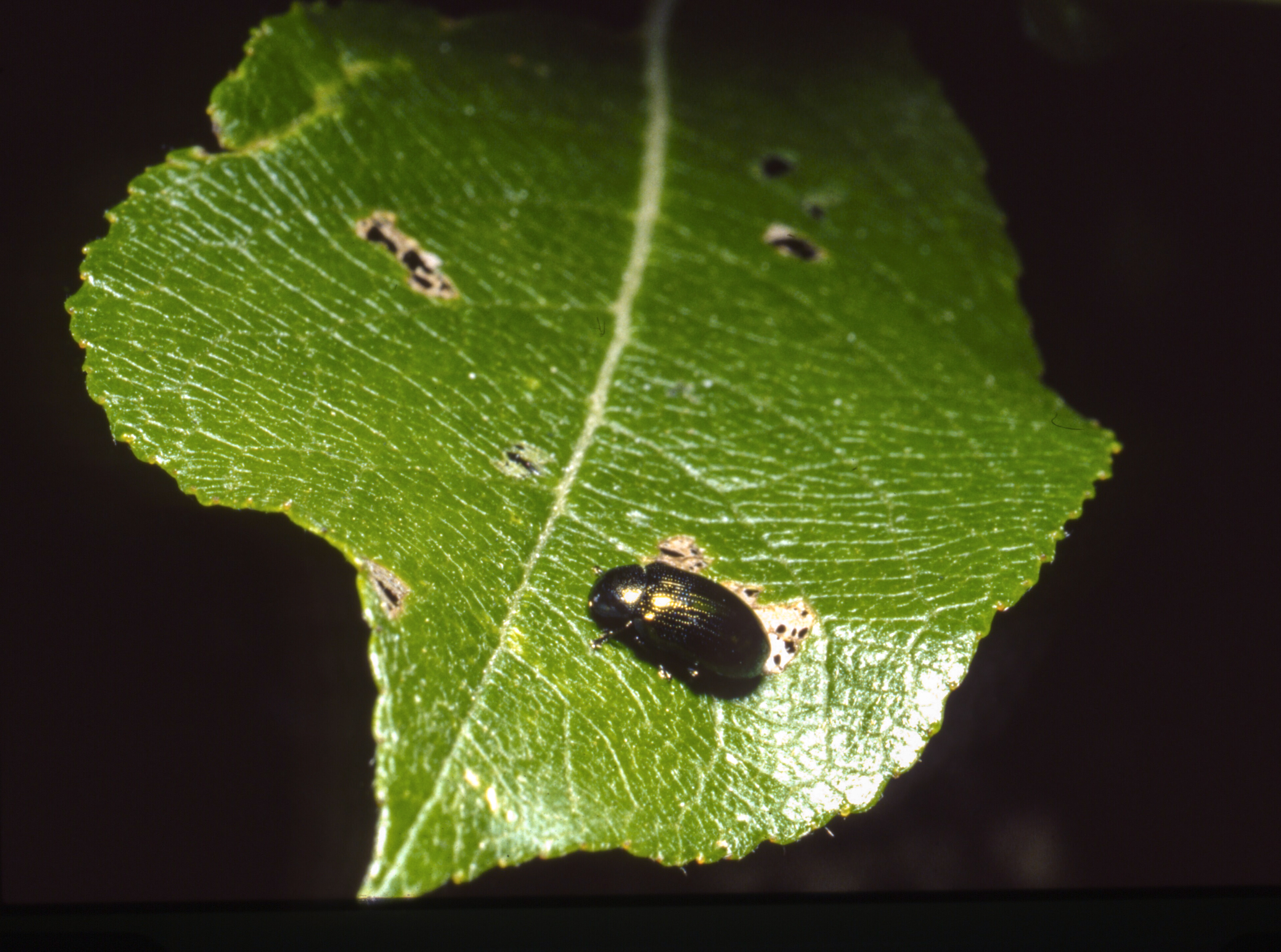

Taken together, these studies suggest that the host preference of P. vitellinae is based on host plant chemistry and that beetles tend to specialize on plants where they obtain host plant compounds present in their larval defensive secretion. It is also notable that P. vitellinae grows well on a broader range of hosts than have been observed as host plants in the field and that other factors influence its performance on different host plants.

== Laboratory studies of biotic effects of larval defensive secretion ==
Early studies of natural enemies of P. vitellinae and its relatives in the laboratory and field were conducted by V. Kanervo in Finland. His work showed that diverse bugs, beetles, and flies attack and consume beetle larvae, including several species with defensive secretions similar to P. vitellinae. Some ladybird beetles, including Calvia quindecimguttata and Oenopia conglobata consume leaf beetle larvae, while other aphid specializing ladybirds do not consume them.

The larval secretion of P. vitellinae contains salicylaldehyde, an irritating volatile compound that was shown to repel ants in the laboratory. In laboratory trials, the predacious sawfly Tenthredo olivacea was more repelled by the secretion of P. vitellinae if it had previously been exposed to different secretions produced by Plagiodera versicolora larvae, but the converse was also true, suggesting that the predator could overcome either type of defensive secretion. Denno et al. (1990) found that P. vitellinae larvae raised on the low-salicylate Salix viminalis were more vulnerable to predation by larvae of the ladybird beetle Adalia bipunctata than larvae raised on the salicylate-rich Salix euxina. The significance of this result is somewhat unclear because A. bipunctata is not known as a natural predator of P. vitellinae, but it does suggest that the salicylaldehyde secretion is repellent to a generalist predator. Palokangas and Neuvonen (1992) showed that the salicylaldehyde based secretion of P. vitellinae was more repellent to crab spiders and wolf spiders than the autogenous secretions produced by the birch-feeding Phratora polaris, consistent with patterns observed with A. bipunctata.

Rank et al. (1998) compared predation success on the salicylate-rich Salix myrsinifolia and the salicylate-poor Salix phylicifolia for three predators that have been observed feeding on P. vitellinae larvae in nature; the bugs Anthocorus nemorum and Rhacognathus punctatus and the hover fly Parasyrphus nigritarsis. They found no evidence that any of these predators are repelled by the P. vitellinae larval defensive secretion, suggesting that the secretion is not effective against many of the predators that encounter P. vitellinae in nature. Subsequent studies demonstrated that P. nigritarsis larvae are attracted to, rather than repelled by the salicylaldehyde secretion. These results do not support the view that the use of salicylate-rich host plants by P. vitellinae evolved because they obtain enemy-free space on those plants. Rather, it seems more likely that sequestering host plant salicylates to make salicyaldehyde may have enabled P. vitellinae to broaden its diet breadth to include both Populus and willow (Salix) host plants. They also suggest that larval defensive secretions have additional functions besides predation deterrence.

One possible function for the larval secretions found in P. vitellinae and other Phratora species is that it provides a signal to P. vitellinae females laying eggs that the individual host plant is already crowded with P. vitellinae offspring that resulted from eggs laid by females that had previously arrived at the same host plant. The secretion may reduce competition among females from the same species for suitable host plants, or it may reduce competition between different beetle species. In support of this hypothesis, it was shown that secretions produced by larvae deter egg laying by females. Another possibility is that the volatile secretion reduces the likelihood of infection by pathogenic bacteria or fungi, a hypothesis supported by demonstrating that salicylaldehyde suppresses growth of bacteria and the fungus Beauveria bassiana.

In summary, the larval defensive secretion of P. vitellinae may serve multiple biological functions, and the use of host plant chemicals as a source for the secretion may have evolved as a mechanism to conserve metabolic energy, altering the relative costs versus benefits of producing a defensive secretion.

== The brassy leaf beetle as a pest ==
Phratora species can be considered pests if their population density increases substantially in Populus and willow (Salix) plantations. Methods of controlling P. vitellinae populations that damage plantation trees include chemical control, habitat modifications such as flooding plantations to reduce numbers of overwintering adults or pupae, breeding resistant plants, or generating genetically modified strains of plants that show resistance to insect herbivores.
