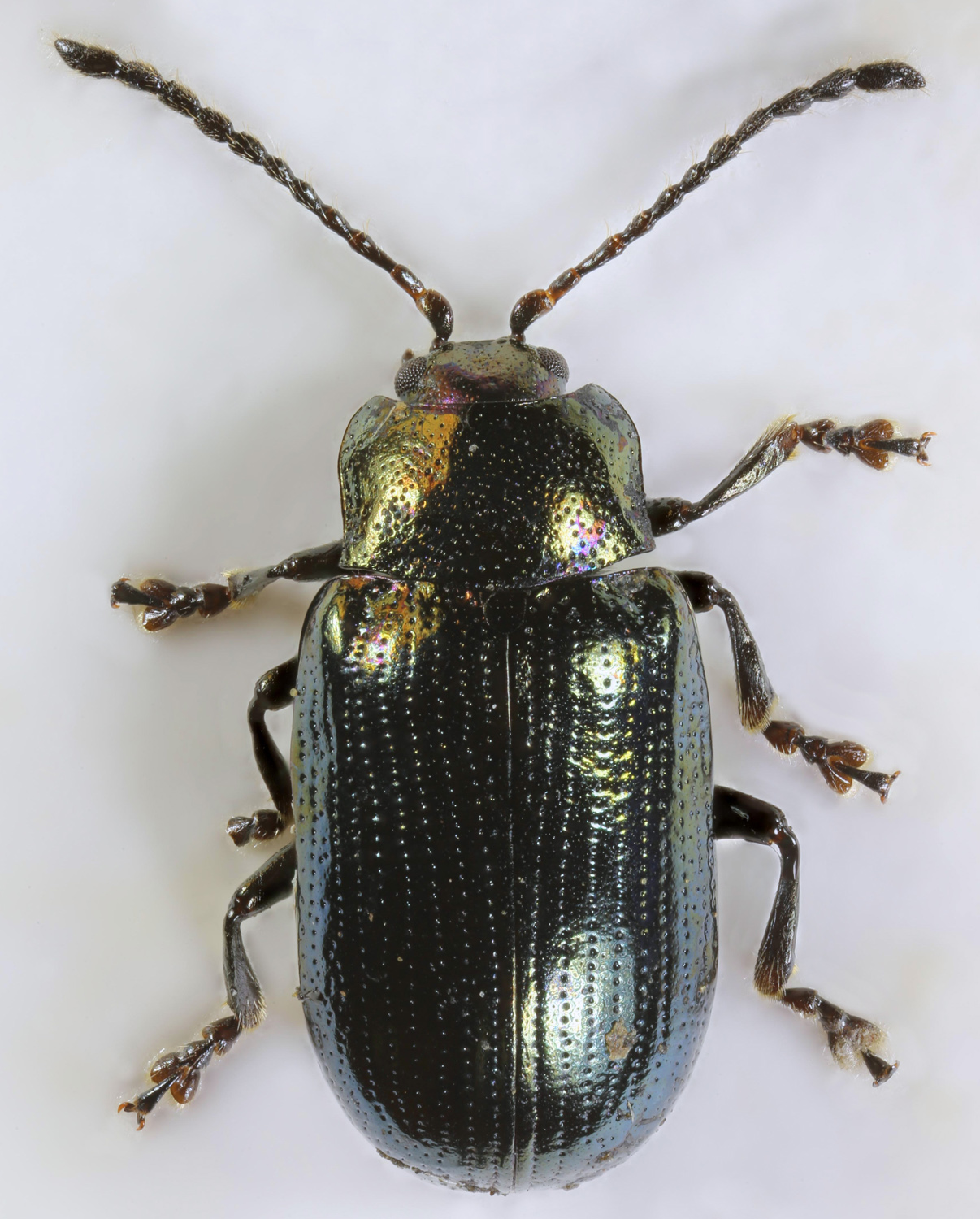

Scientific classification
- Kingdom: Animalia
- Phylum: Arthropoda
- Clade: Pancrustacea
- Class: Insecta
- Order: Coleoptera
- Suborder: Polyphaga
- Infraorder: Cucujiformia
- Family: Chrysomelidae
- Genus: Phratora
- Species: P. laticollis

Binomial name
- Phratora laticollis (Suffrian, 1851)

= Phratora laticollis =

Species of beetle

Phratora laticollis is a species of leaf beetle found in Europe and Asia. This beetle is found on Populus species and the chemistry and production of its larval defensive secretions and host plant relationships have been studied extensively.

== Description ==
This small (3.7–5 mm) beetle is similar and size and coloration to other species of Phratora. Adults are typically metallic blue or green. In Europe, it is most likely to co-occur on Populus host species with two other Phratora species Phratora vitellinae and Phratora atrovirens. It is larger and more abundant than P. atrovirens and somewhat narrower in body shape than P. vitellinae. Eggs are typically laid in clutches of 8–16, arranged in rows on the underside of the host leaf. Like other Phratora species, eggs are partially covered with a crusty secretion. Larvae feed in groups in early instars (molts), and sometimes show color polymorphisms.

== Range ==
Phratora laticollis has a widespread distribution. In Europe, it is found in Arctic regions and the Nordic countries, the United Kingdom, Germany to Spain, Serbia and Bosnia, and Bulgaria. It is also found in China and elsewhere in Asia. Populations occur at high elevations in parts of central Europe and China.

== Habitat and host plants ==
Phratora laticollis adults feed and lay eggs on Populus trees, including Populus tremula, Populus nigra, and Populus alba. Their larvae develop on the same host plants as adults. Their host plants belong to the family Salicaceae, but unlike the willow species (Salix) that other Phratora species favor, Populus species all contain relatively high levels of salicylates in their leaves. Laboratory feeding tests showed that the phenol glycosides (salicylates) characteristic of Populus species stimulate P. laticollis feeding. They are also attracted to volatile compounds emitted by host trees, which may explain preferences based on host plant gender and prior history of insect herbivory.

== Life history ==
Lühmann (1939) described the life history of a population in Germany in detail. After overwintering, adult beetles seek mid-sized trees of Populus tremula within aspen groves for feeding, oviposition, and production of the summer generation. When spring arrives, overwintered beetles spend 2–3 weeks feeding and lay up to 250 eggs on the undersides of leaves. After eggs hatched, larvae spent about 5–6 days in the first, second, and third instars before leaving the host plant and making a pupal case. After about six days, adults emerge and remain in the pupal case for an additional two days before emerging. In central Europe, this species can experience multiple generations per growing season (multivoltine), but it appears to undergo only one generation per summer in the Nordic countries or at high elevations. Overwintering was observed under the bark of fir trees near the Populus tremula stand where beetle populations had been found.

Van der Laak (1982) investigated the mechanisms of cold tolerance and overwintering success in P. laticollis. These studies revealed that P. laticollis can be 'freeze-tolerant' in summer and winter. Multiple mechanisms influence cold tolerance and it varies over the year partly due to the concentration of metabolic products such as glycerol and other factors.

== Larval secretion chemistry ==
Phratora laticollis larvae secrete a defensive secretion that contains iridoid monoterpenes that they synthesize themselves (autogeneously), while their congener Phratora vitellinae sequesters host plant salicylates to make its larval defensive secretion. Using host plant compounds to make the larval defensive secretions appears to be the evolutionarily advanced or derived state of this trait, but P. laticollis appears to be pre-adapted to evolve the use of host plant salicylates to produce its defensive secretion. Larvae of P. laticollis already possess systems to transport plant secondary compounds that can be modified to sequester those compounds for their own defense.

== Natural enemies ==
Lühmann (1939) described a fly predator that consumed the eggs and larvae of P. laticollis and these descriptions suggest that it was the syrphid fly Parasyrphus nigritarsis. He also mentioned the presence of tachinid fly parasitoids that attacked P. laticollis larvae but emerged when the beetle reached the adult stage. These parasitoids might be Medina luctuosa, which others observed attacking P. laticollis adults along with a braconid wasp in the genus Perilitus, which is likely Perilitus brevicollis, a known parasitoid of Phratora vulgatissima. Larvae are also parasitized by Meigenia mutabilis, a tachinid fly The bug Rhacognathus punctatus consumes adult beetles. Most likely, the bug Anthocorus nemorum consumes P. laticollis larvae. The wasp Symmorphus bifasciatus feeds on larvae of Phratora species, including P. laticollis. Overall, many of the same species that feed on P. laticollis also consume other Phratora species and other leaf beetles, which often occur on the same host plants and similar habitats. Some of these enemies appear to be attracted to leaf beetle secretions.

== Taxonomy ==
Species in the genus Phratora are morphologically fairly uniform, but vary substantially in their host plant preferences. Ge (2005) noted that a newly described Phratora species in China, P. quadrithoralis, closely resembles P. laticollis. Within Europe, the closest relative to P. laticollis appears to be another specialist on Populus, P. atrovirens.
