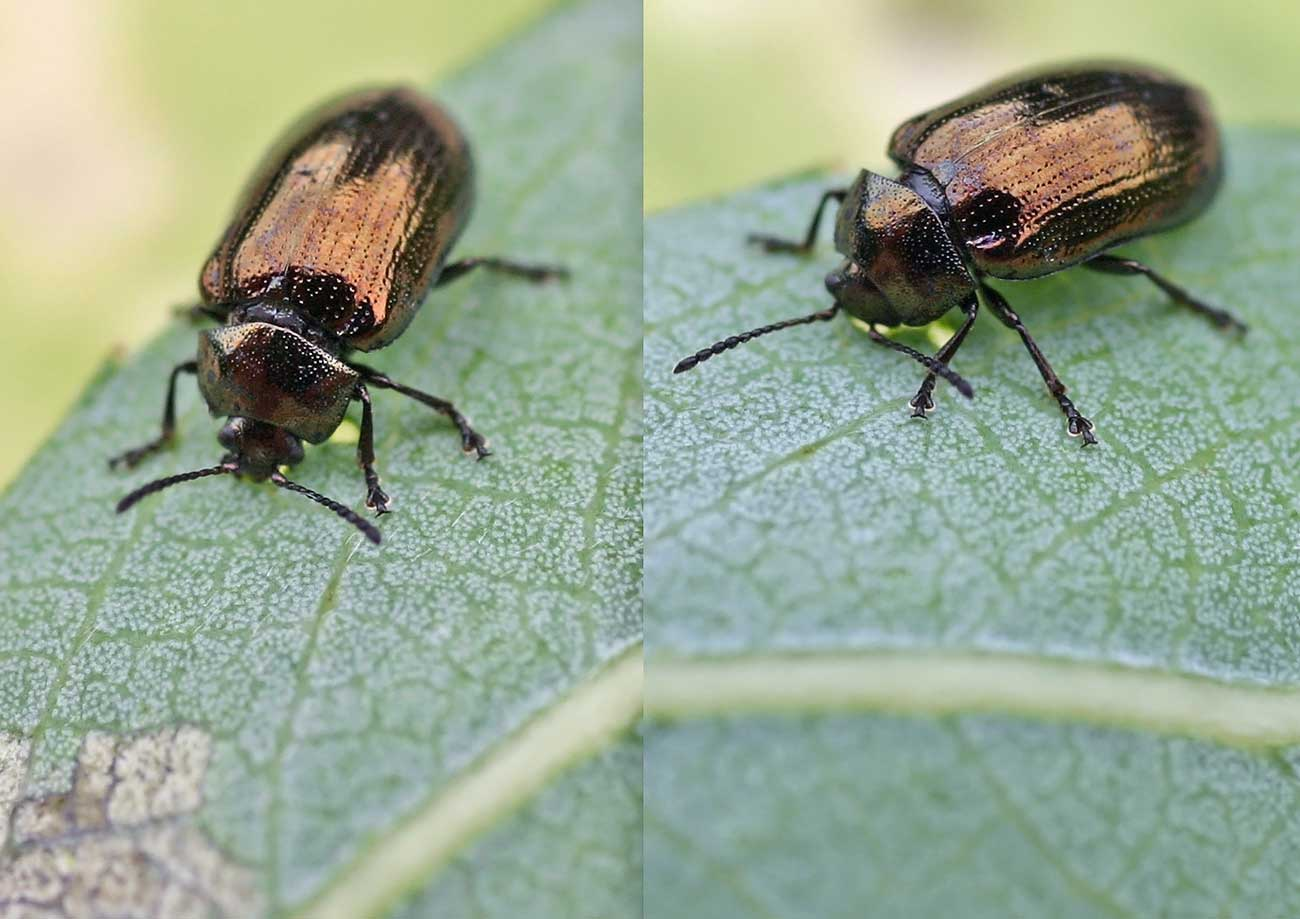

Scientific classification
- Kingdom: Animalia
- Phylum: Arthropoda
- Clade: Pancrustacea
- Class: Insecta
- Order: Coleoptera
- Suborder: Polyphaga
- Infraorder: Cucujiformia
- Family: Chrysomelidae
- Tribe: Chrysomelini
- Genus: Phratora; Chevrolat in Dejean, 1836

Synonyms
- Phyllodecta Kirby, 1837

= Phratora =

Genus of beetles

Phratora is a genus of leaf beetles. It is synonymous to Phyllodecta . European Phratora species can be distinguished based on morphology of female genitalia., but they differ little in size and body form and most show metallic coloration.

== Distribution ==
Phratora species are found in the Northern Hemisphere in areas that tend to be cool and moist where their host plants thrive. They are usually found in Northern and Southern Europe, China and Japan, and in Canada and the United States of America.

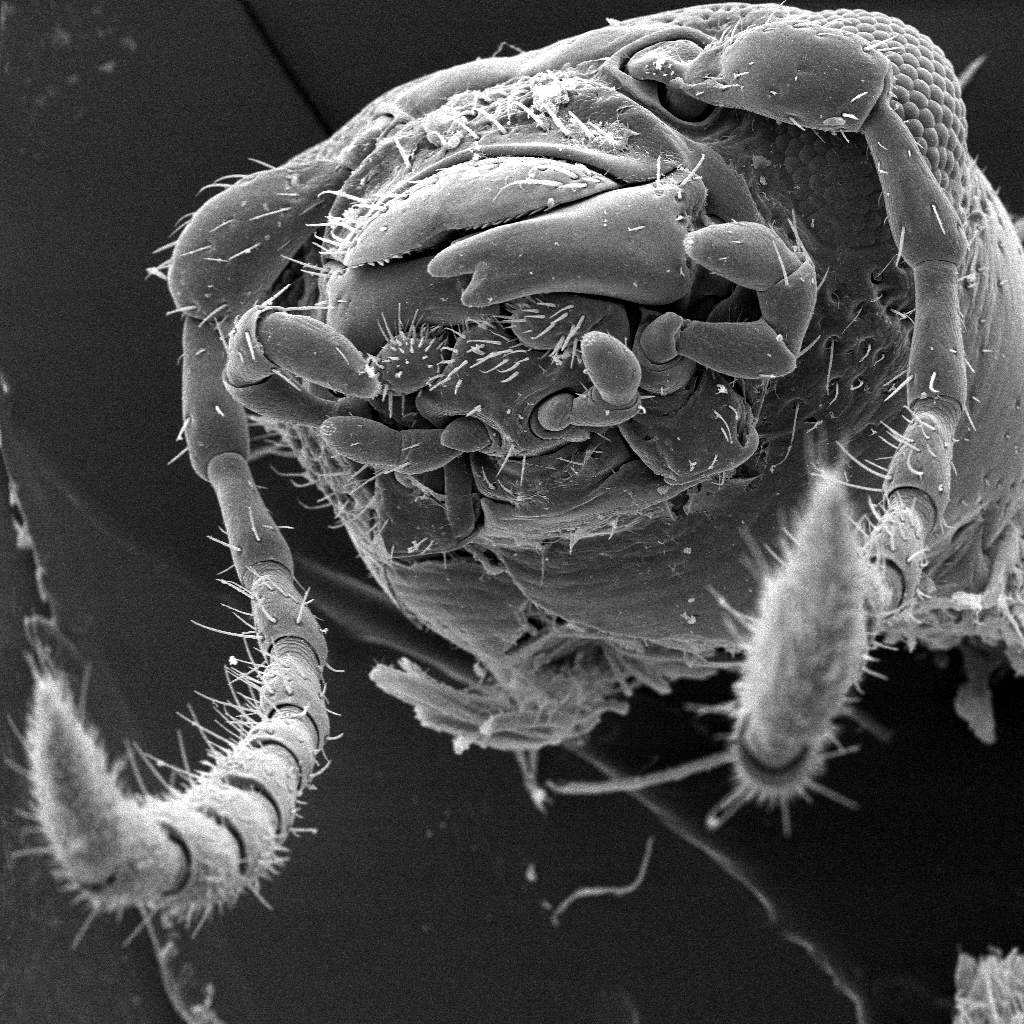
Head of Phratora adult

== Host plants ==
Species in this genus are of considerable interest to evolutionary ecology researchers because they vary with respect to host plant preference and chemistry of their larval defensive secretions. Phratora species are known to feed on willows (Phratora americana, P. frosti, P. interstitialis, P. tibialis, Phratora vitellinae, Phratora vulgatissima, P. polaris, P. purpurea), poplars (Phratora laticollis, P. atrovirens, Phratora vitellinae, P. purpurea), or birch (P. polaris in Lapland, Phratora hudsonia), and their host plant use is evolutionarily conserved in that closely related beetle species tend to feed on more closely related plant species.

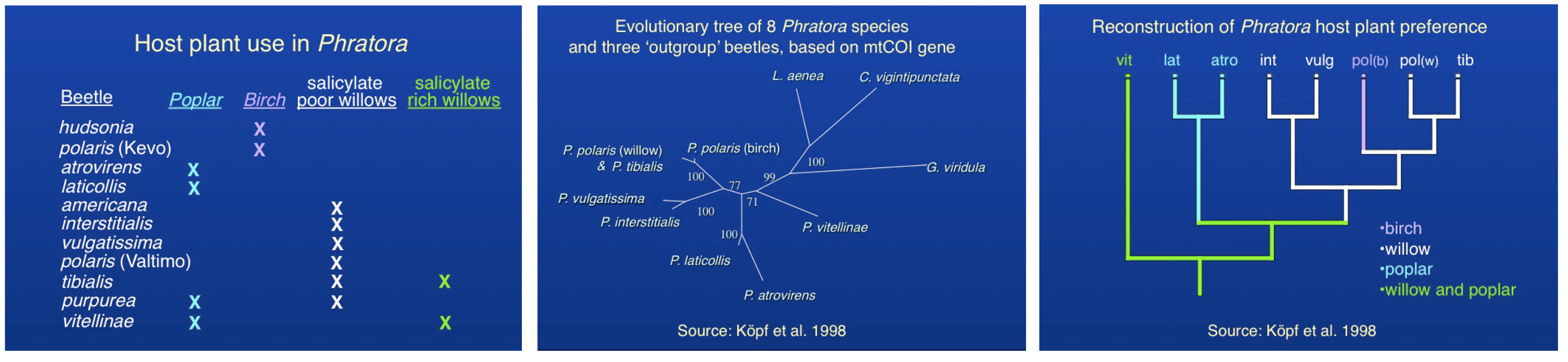
Host plant use and evolutionary relationships among Phratora species

== Natural enemies ==
Predators of Phratora eggs include A. nemorum, Orthotylus marginalisand the syrphid fly Parasyrphus nigritarsis. Larval predators include A. nemorum, the bug Rhacognathus punctatus, and the wasp Symmorphus bifasciatus. Adult beetles are consumed by R. punctatus. More information about natural enemies can be found in the articles about Phratora laticollis, Phratora vitellinae and Phratora vulgatissima.

== Larval defense secretions ==
The mechanism of larval defensive secretion production, its relationship to host plant preference, and its evolutionary significance has been studied. The secretions can repel natural enemies or conspecifics. More information about larval secretions can be found in the articles about Phratora laticollis and Phratora vitellinae.

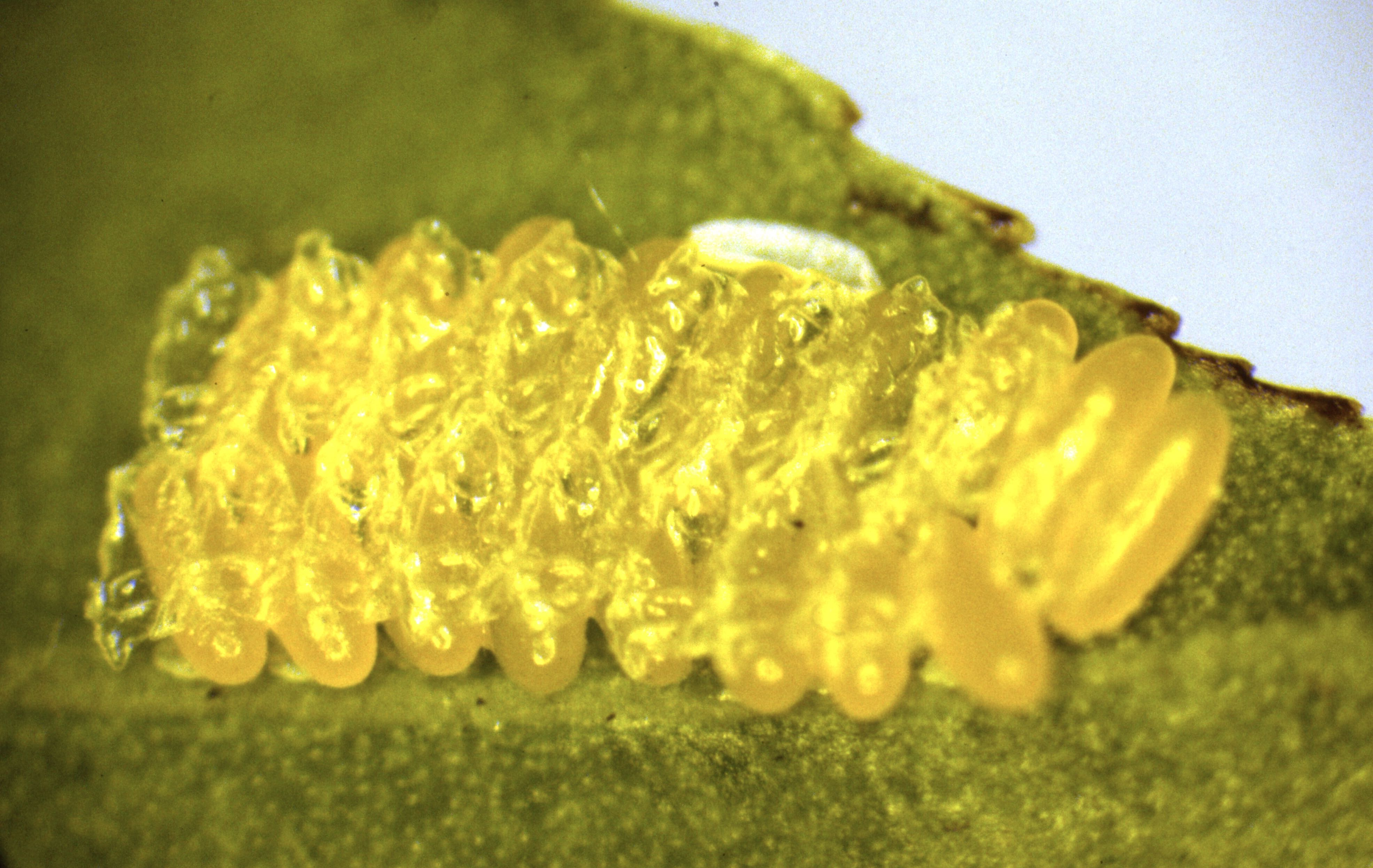
Egg of Parasyrphus nigritarsus (top, pale) on egg clutch of Phratora vitellinae (yellow). The crusty secretion on top of the beetle eggs is evident.

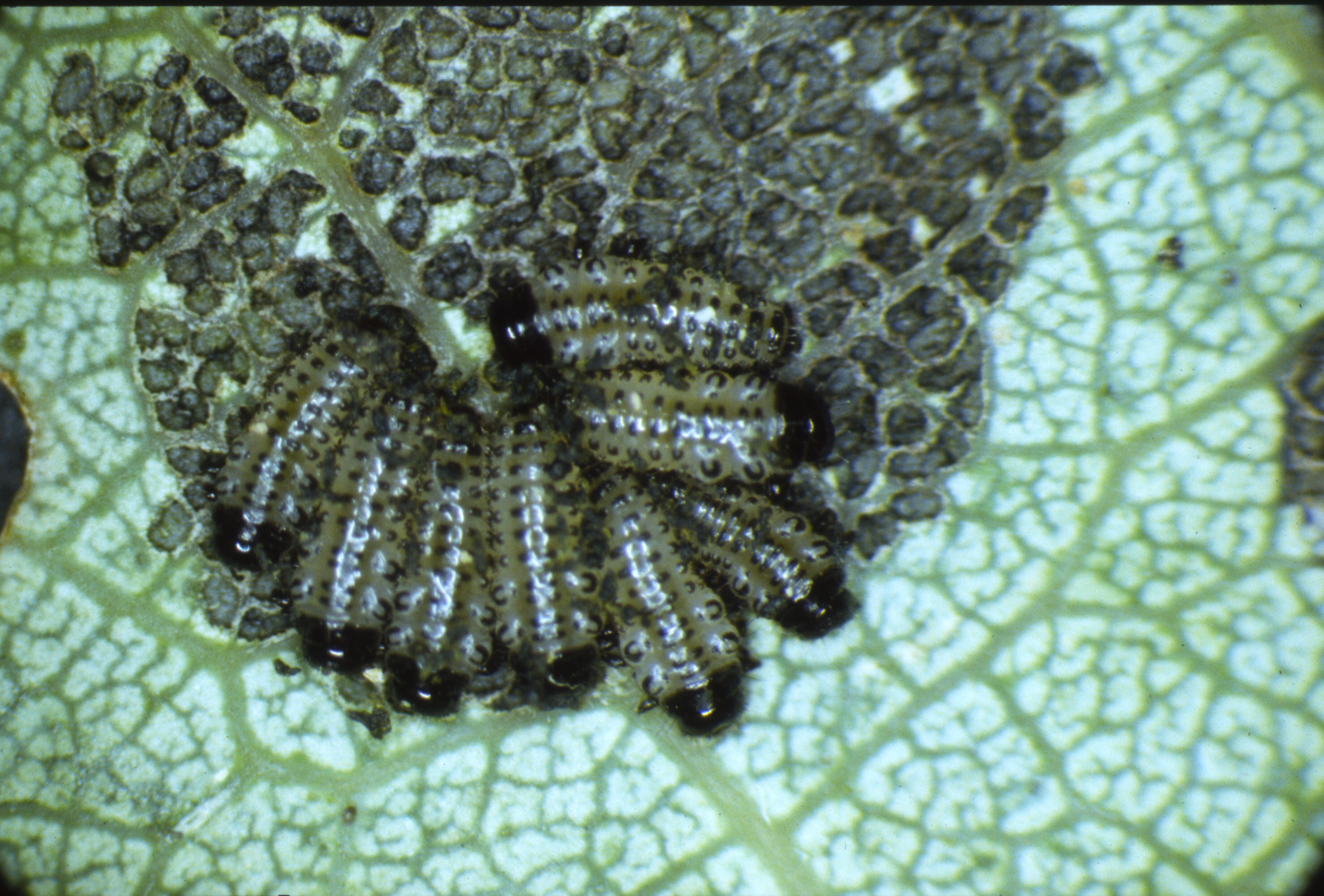
Phratora vitellinae larvae feeding on Populus tremula

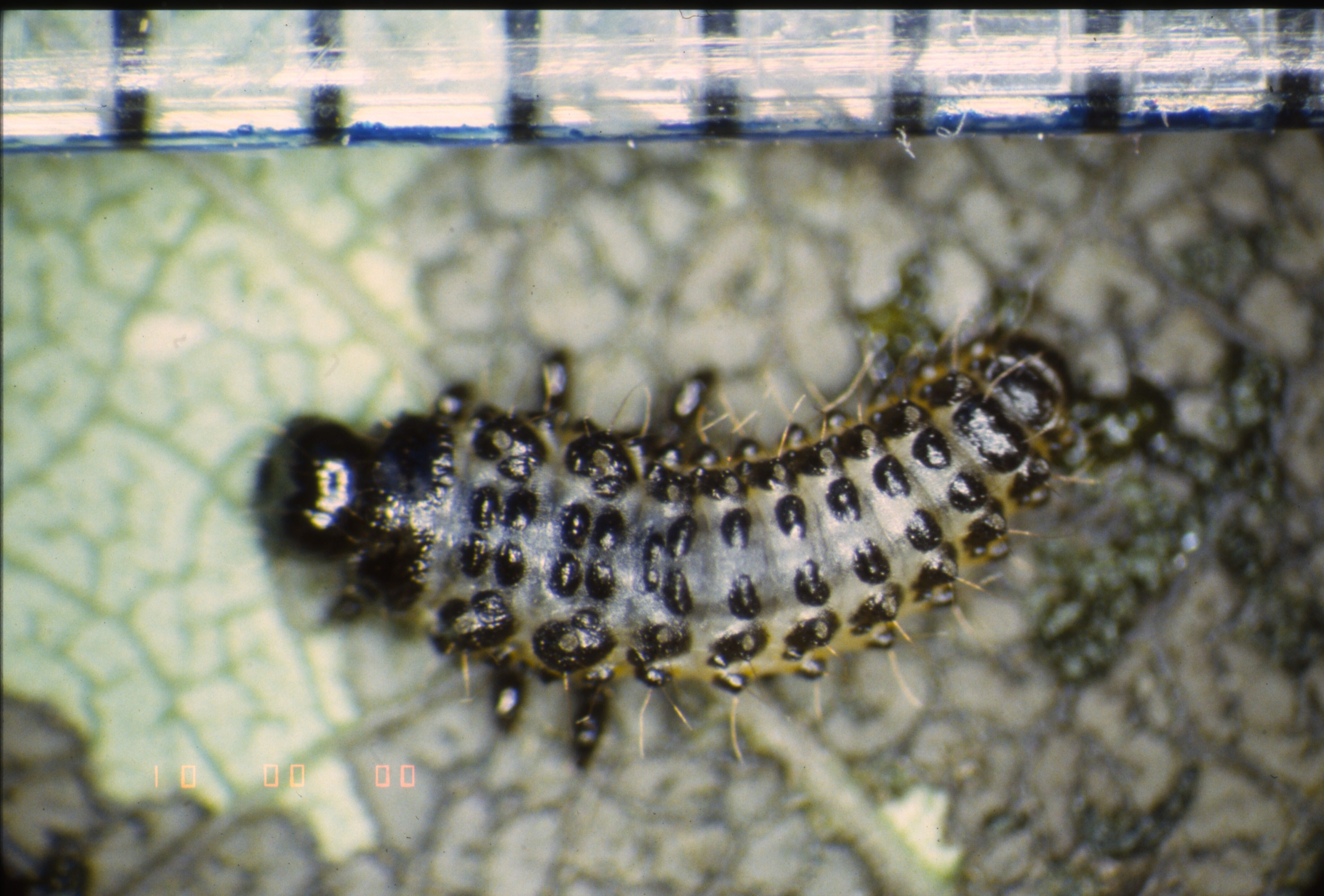
Third instar Phratora vitellinae larva feeding on a willow leaf

== Economic Importance ==
Some species (especially Phratora vulgatissima) are considered pests when populations build up in willow plantations.

== Species ==
These 16 species belong to the genus Phratora:

- Phratora americana (Schaeffer, 1928)^{i c g b}
- Phratora antennaria (Apfelbeck, 1912)^{g}
- Phratora atrovirens (Cornelius, 1857)^{g}
- Phratora californica Brown, 1961^{i c g}
- Phratora frosti Brown, 1951^{i c g}
- Phratora hudsonia Brown, 1951^{i c g b} (birch leaf beetle)
- Phratora interstitialis Mannerheim, 1853^{i c g b}
- Phratora kenaiensis Brown, 1952^{i c g}
- Phratora koreana Takizawa, 1985^{g}
- Phratora laticollis (Suffrian, 1851)^{g}
- Phratora polaris (Sparre Schneider, 1886)^{g}
- Phratora purpurea Brown, 1951^{i c g b} (aspen skeletonizer)
- Phratora similis (Chujo, 1958)^{g}
- Phratora tibialis (Suffrian, 1851)^{g}
- Phratora vitellinae (Linnaeus, 1758)^{g} (brassy leaf beetle)
- Phratora vulgatissima (Linnaeus, 1758)^{g} (blue willow leaf beetle)

Data sources: i = ITIS, c = Catalogue of Life, g = GBIF, b = Bugguide.net
