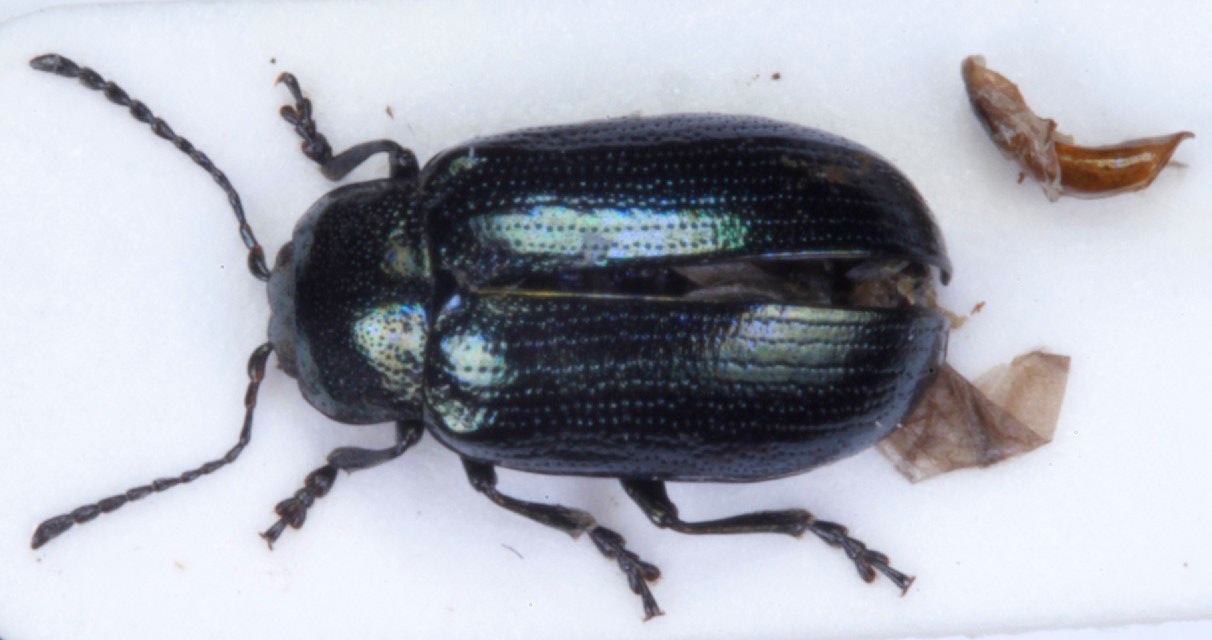

Scientific classification
- Kingdom: Animalia
- Phylum: Arthropoda
- Clade: Pancrustacea
- Class: Insecta
- Order: Coleoptera
- Suborder: Polyphaga
- Infraorder: Cucujiformia
- Family: Chrysomelidae
- Genus: Phratora
- Species: P. polaris

Binomial name
- Phratora polaris (Sparre Schneider, 1886)

= Phratora polaris =

Species of beetle

Phratora polaris is a species of leaf beetle found in the Nordic regions of Europe., occasionally in Scotland, and Iceland. Some authors have recorded it in central Europe, especially in the Alps. Historically, this species has occurred in Greenland. This beetle is found on willow (Salix) species in the southern part of its range. Populations in Lapland feed on birch.

== Description ==
This small (3.7–5 mm) beetle is similar in size and shape to other species of Phratora. Willow-feeding adults are typically metallic blue or green, but birch feeding populations are metallic dark brown Larvae are dark to black and pupae are pale.

== Distribution and range ==
Phratora polaris occurs in the Nordic regions of Europe, occasionally in Scotland, and Iceland. It has also been recorded in the eastern Alps. and in Germany.

== Habitat and host plants ==
Phratora polaris is the only Phratora species known to feed on host plants in two different plant families (Salicaceae) and (Betulaceae). In most of its range, P. polaris adults and larvae feed and lay eggs on willow (Salix) plants. In Iceland, Norway and Scotland, populations are found on the low-growing Salix herbacea. In Norway and Finland, populations occur on the tea-leaved willow (Salix phylicifolia) and on Salix polaris. In Alpine Austria, it has been recorded on Salix arbuscula. In Finnish Lapland and Swedish Lapland, P. polaris is known to feed on Betula pubescens.

== Taxonomy ==
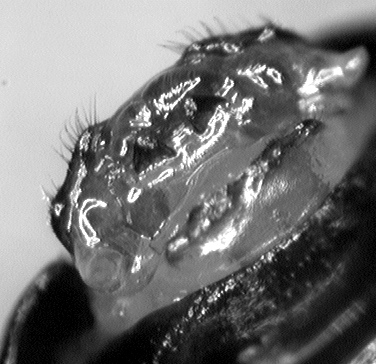
Genitalia of female Phratora polaris from Finland

Phratora polaris is closely related to Phratora tibialis, as noted by Palmen, Steinhausen, Sundholm, and Köpf et al. (1996). Male and female genitalia of P. polaris (which can be observed with live beetles under the dissecting scope when pressure is applied to the abdomen), closely resemble those of P. tibialis. Steinhausen (1993) described populations in Austria as belonging to a 'boreal-alpine' form of P. polaris.

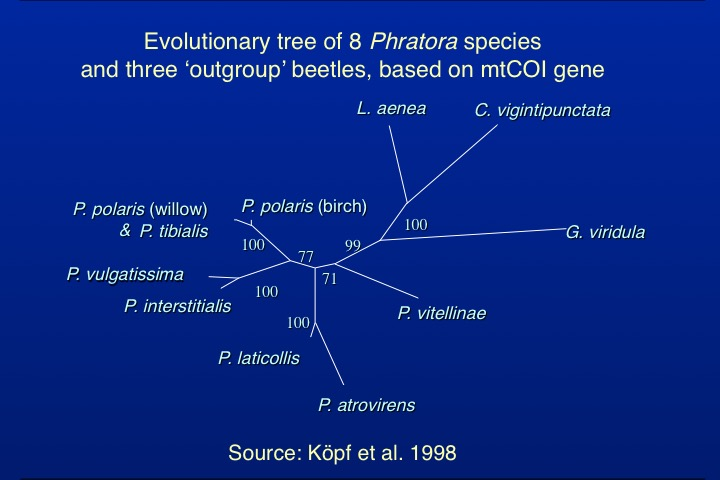

Mitochondrial sequences at the mitochondrial cytochrome c oxidase subunit I (DNA barcoding) gene show more divergence among willow- vs birch-feeding populations of P. polaris within Finland than between willow-feeding populations of P. polaris from Finland and P. tibialis from Switzerland. In 1996, Köpf et al. examined host plant preferences and mating behaviors for P. tibialis populations from Switzerland and a P. polaris population in eastern Finland. Beetles from all three populations showed similar host plant preferences, regardless of the host plant that they had been collected on, and P. tibialis and P. polaris individuals also mated with each other freely. These behavioral studies suggest that the actual biological species boundaries may be different than current classifications suggest. For example, birch-feeding populations of P. polaris might be classified as different species.

== Life history and natural enemies ==
Like other Phratora species at high altitudes and latitudes, P. polaris probably undergoes one generation within a growing season. It probably shares the same natural enemies as other Phratora species, which are described in more detail for Phratora vitellinae and Phratora laticollis.

== Larval secretion chemistry ==
Phratora polaris larvae secrete a defensive secretion that contains iridoid monoterpenes that they synthesize themselves (autogeneously), while their congener Phratora vitellinae sequesters host plant salicylates to make its larval defensive secretion. Using host plant compounds to make the larval defensive secretions appears to be the evolutionarily advanced or derived state of this trait. Studies of the effect of these defensive secretions on potential generalist spider predators revealed that the spiders ate larvae of P. polaris more readily than P. vitellinae, which was probably because the defensive secretion of Phratora vitellinae was more repellent to the spiders than the secretion of P. polaris.
