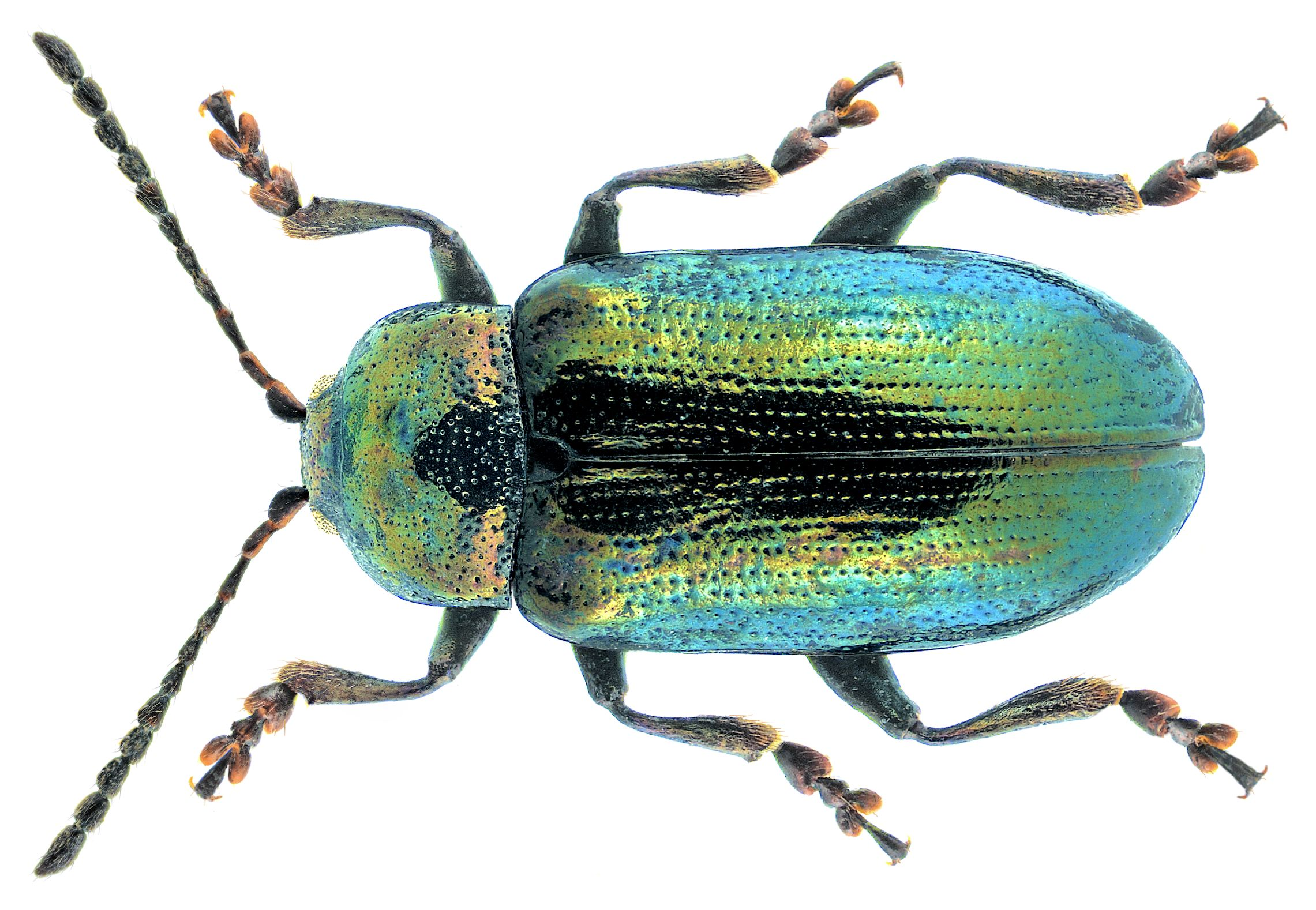

Scientific classification
- Kingdom: Animalia
- Phylum: Arthropoda
- Clade: Pancrustacea
- Class: Insecta
- Order: Coleoptera
- Suborder: Polyphaga
- Infraorder: Cucujiformia
- Family: Chrysomelidae
- Genus: Phratora
- Species: P. tibialis

Binomial name
- Phratora tibialis (Suffrian, 1851)

Synonyms
- Phratora cornelii (Weise, 1882); Phratora viennensis (Weise, 1882)

= Phratora tibialis =

Species of beetle

Phratora tibialis is a species of leaf beetle found in Europe and parts of Asia. This beetle is found on willows (Salix species) and the chemistry and production of its larval defensive secretions and host plant relationships have been studied extensively.

== Description ==
This small (3.7–5 mm) beetle is similar and size and coloration to other species of Phratora. Adults are typically metallic blue or green. In Europe, it is most likely to co-occur on Salix host species with Phratora vitellinae. It is somewhat narrower in body shape than P. vitellinae. This beetle is very similar in morphology and behavior to the Nordic species Phratora polaris, as noted by Palmen, Steinhausen, Sundholm, and Köpf et al. (1996). For example, the female genitalia of P. tibialis, (which can be examined with live beetles when moderate pressure is applied to the abdomen under the dissecting scope), closely resemble those of P. polaris.

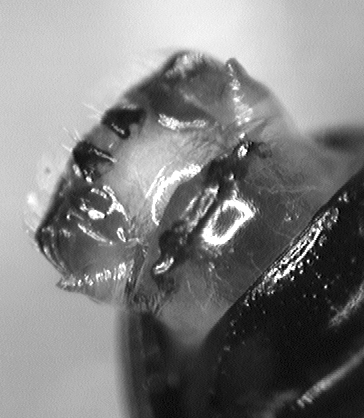
Genitalia of a female Phratora tibialis individual

Eggs are typically laid in clutches of 8-16, arranged in rows on the underside of the host leaf. Like other Phratora species, eggs are partially covered with a crusty secretion. Larvae feed in groups in early instars (molts). Larvae show little variation in color pattern, in contrast to some other Phratora species.

== Distribution and range ==
Phratora tibialis has a widespread distribution in Europe. It is known from the Netherlands, Germany, Poland, Latvia Spain, Slovakia, Serbia and Bosnia, and Bulgaria. Populations occur at high elevations in parts of central Europe. It is also known from Iran and the Caucasus.

== Taxonomy ==
The closest known relative to P. tibialis is P. polaris, which occurs in the Nordic countries. Mitochondrial sequences at the mitochondrial cytochrome c oxidase subunit I (DNA barcoding) gene show little variation between these two Phratora species, which supports the findings of prior studies comparing morphological characters between them. In 1996, Köpf et al. examined host plant preferences and mating behaviors for P. tibialis populations from Switzerland and a P. polaris population in eastern Finland. Beetles from all three populations showed similar host plant preferences, regardless of the host plant that they had been collected on, and P. tibialis and P. polaris individuals also mated with each other freely. Earlier investigators had proposed that willow-feeding P. polaris might be a Nordic subspecies of P. tibialis, and these behavioral studies support the view that the two species are very closely related or even possibly geographically separated populations of a single species.

== Habitat and host plants ==
Phratora tibialis adults feed and lay eggs on willow (Salix) shrubs. Their larvae develop on the same host plants as adults. Phratora tibialis is found on the high salicylate willow species Salix purpurea throughout most of their range. In the 1990s, a population of P. tibialis was found feeding on Salix daphnoides plants along a stream in a rural area near Alpthal, Switzerland. This willow contains low levels of salicylates. The presence of P. tibialis on willow species with very different leaf chemistries makes this beetle an exception within the genus Phratora because most species within this genus specialize on either high salicylate host plants or low salicylate ones. In the laboratory, P. tibialis appears to be able to feed on other willows that possess very different leaf chemistries, including Salix euxina (syn. S. fragilis), Salix triandra, Salix caprea, and Salix phylicifolia.

== Life history and natural enemies ==
Like other Phratora species, P. tibialis can undergo multiple generations within a growing season. It probably shares the same natural enemies, which are described in more detail for Phratora vitellinae and Phratora laticollis.

== Larval secretion chemistry ==
Phratora tibialis larvae secrete a defensive secretion that contains iridoid monoterpenes that they synthesize themselves (autogeneously), while their congener Phratora vitellinae sequesters host plant salicylates to make its larval defensive secretion. Using host plant compounds to make the larval defensive secretions appears to be the evolutionarily advanced or derived state of this trait, but P. tibialis appears to be pre-adapted to evolve the use of host plant salicylates to produce its defensive secretion.
