= Phratora interstitialis =

Scientific classification
- Kingdom: Animalia
- Phylum: Arthropoda
- Clade: Pancrustacea
- Class: Insecta
- Order: Coleoptera
- Suborder: Polyphaga
- Infraorder: Cucujiformia
- Family: Chrysomelidae
- Genus: Phratora
- Species: P. interstitialis

Binomial name
- Phratora interstitialis Mannerheim, 1853

Synonyms
- Phratora aklaviki (Carr)

Species of beetle

Phratora interstitialis is a species of leaf beetle in the family Chrysomelidae. It is found in Europe and Northern Asia (excluding China) and North America. This leaf beetle feeds on host plants that are poor in salicylates (e.g. Salix alexensis and Salix sitchensis) and is closely related to the European Phratora vulgatissima, which also feeds on salicylate-poor willows.
