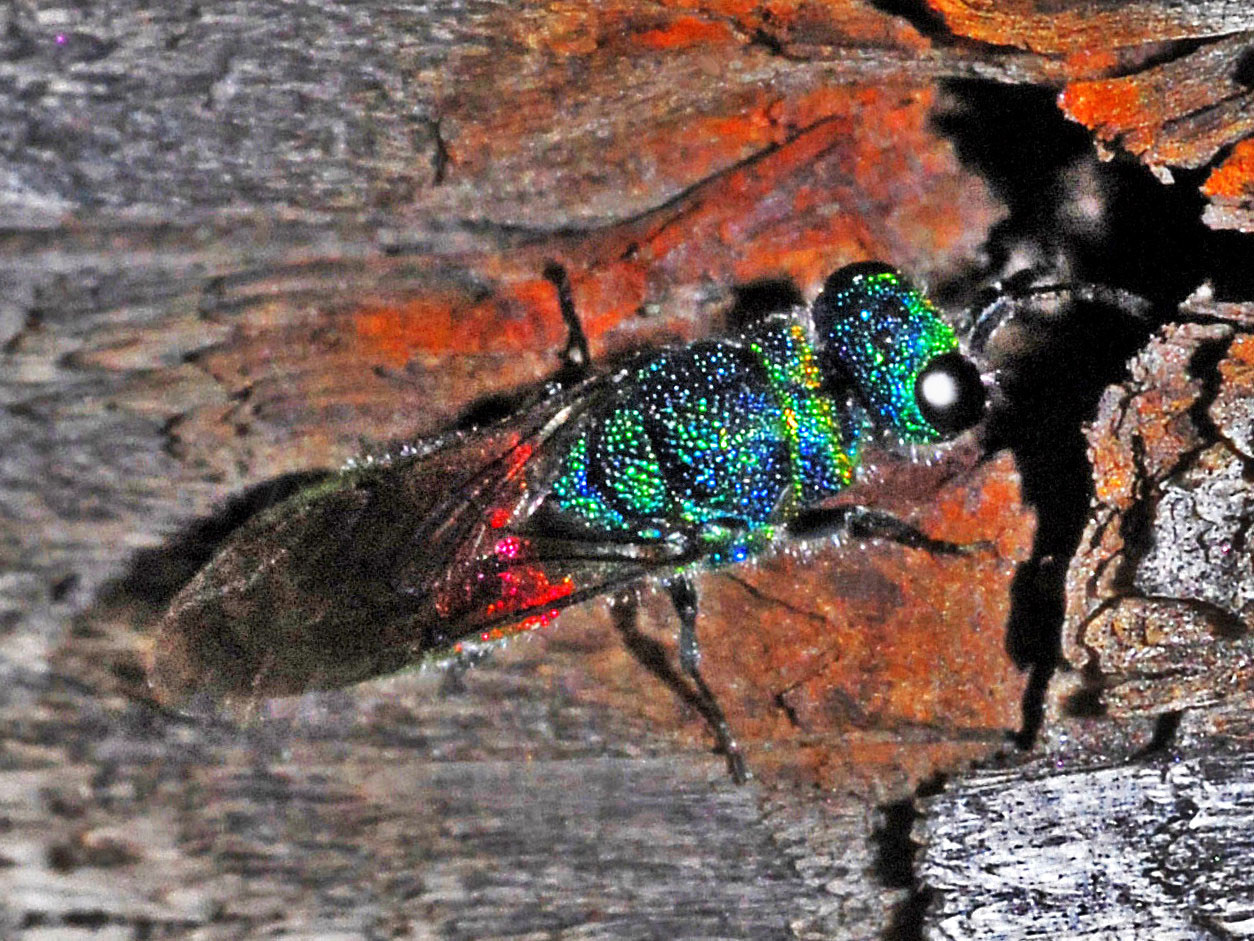
- Chrysis angustula

Scientific classification
- Kingdom: Animalia
- Phylum: Arthropoda
- Clade: Pancrustacea
- Class: Insecta
- Order: Hymenoptera
- Family: Chrysididae
- Genus: Chrysis
- Species: C. angustula

Binomial name
- Chrysis angustula Schenck, 1856

= Chrysis angustula =

Species of wasp

Chrysis angustula is a species of cuckoo wasps, insects in the family Chrysididae.

== Subspecies ==
Subspecies include:

- Chrysis angustula alpina Niehuis, 2000
- Chrysis angustula angustula Schenck, 1856

== Distribution ==
This rather common Trans-Palearctic species is widespread in most of Europe. southwestern Asia, Siberia and China.

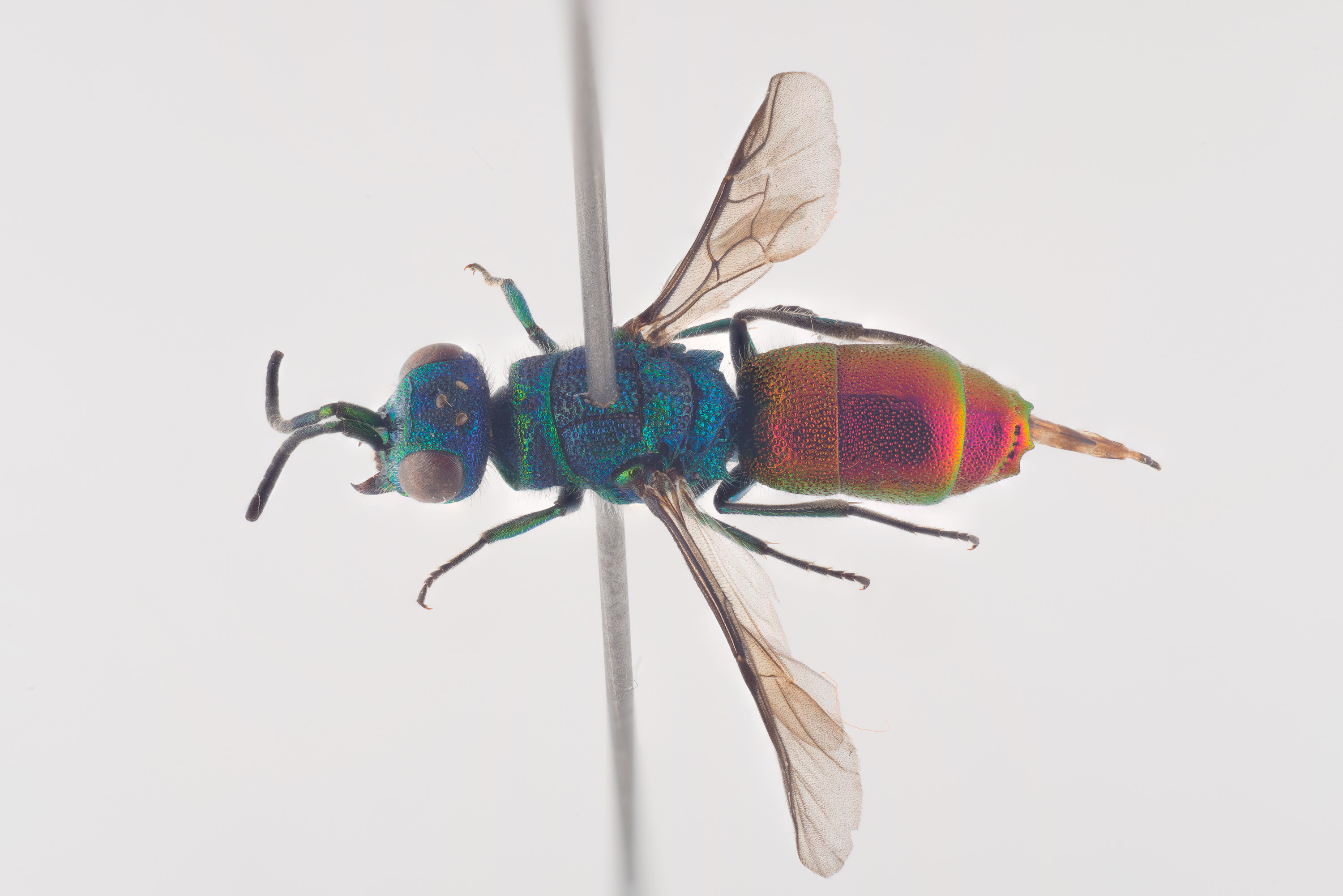
Mounted specimen

== Habitat ==
These wasps mainly occurs on wooded pastures, sparse forests, forest margins, clearings, gardens and parks, preferably with sun-exposed dead trees and stumps. They can be easily found also on walls of wooden buildings, old wood's doors, poles, log piles and dead tree trunks.

== Description ==
Chrysis angustula can reach a body length of about 6–9 mm (0.24–0.35 in). These relatively small cuckoo wasps are part of the difficult-to-determine Chrysis ignita complex, with more than ten similar species. The head and the anterior part of the body are metallic shiny green blue, often with extensive gold-colored drawings in the middle body. The abdomen is rather elongated and shows a characteristic metallic golden color, with reddish or green sheen. Moreover, the posterior dorsal plate is provided with rather small and sparse points, gliding towards the back edge of the plate. The apical teeth of the abdomen are short, while the central interval is rather wide.

This species is very closely related to Chrysis leptomandibularis, that has a very strongly flattened jaws without punctuation or other structure, while the jaws of Chrysis angustula are noticeably thickened when viewed from the side.

== Biology ==
Video clip

Adults can be found from May to September. They occasionally visit flowers of Apiaceae and Asteraceae. Similarly to other cuckoo wasps, they are brood parasites, laying their eggs in the nest or cavities of their host species, feeding on their larvae and on the food supply allocated to them. The hosts may be many different species of solitary wasps, but it is mainly the widespread Symmorphus bifasciatus.

Other recorded hosts are Ancistrocerus trifasciatus, Symmorphus allobrogus, Symmorphus connexus and Symmorphus debilitatus, Odynerus sinuatus, Odynerus bifasciatus, Ancistrocerus sp., Trypoxylon attenuatum, Trypoxylon figulus, Crabro sp., Eriades florisomnis, and Prosopis gibba.
