= Phratora americana =

Scientific classification
- Kingdom: Animalia
- Phylum: Arthropoda
- Clade: Pancrustacea
- Class: Insecta
- Order: Coleoptera
- Suborder: Polyphaga
- Infraorder: Cucujiformia
- Family: Chrysomelidae
- Genus: Phratora
- Species: P. americana

Binomial name
- Phratora americana (Schaeffer, 1928)

Species of beetle

Phratora americana is a species of leaf beetle in the family Chrysomelidae. It is found in North America.This species is known from Ontario, Quebec, and high elevations in the eastern United States of America. It feeds on willow species and varies in colour from purple to blue or blue-green.

== Subspecies ==
These two subspecies belong to the species Phratora americana:

- Phratora americana americana (Schaeffer, 1928)^{i c g}
- Phratora americana canadensis Brown, 1951^{i c g}

Data sources: i = ITIS, c = Catalogue of Life, g = GBIF, b = Bugguide.net
