= Perilitus brevicollis =

Scientific classification
- Kingdom: Animalia
- Phylum: Arthropoda
- Class: Insecta
- Order: Hymenoptera
- Family: Braconidae
- Genus: Perilitus
- Species: P. brevicollis

Binomial name
- Perilitus brevicollis (Haliday, 1835)

Species of wasp

Perilitus brevicollis is a species of parasitoid wasp in the family Braconidae. The host of this wasp is the blue willow beetle (Phratora vulgatissima), which is a pest in Europe.
