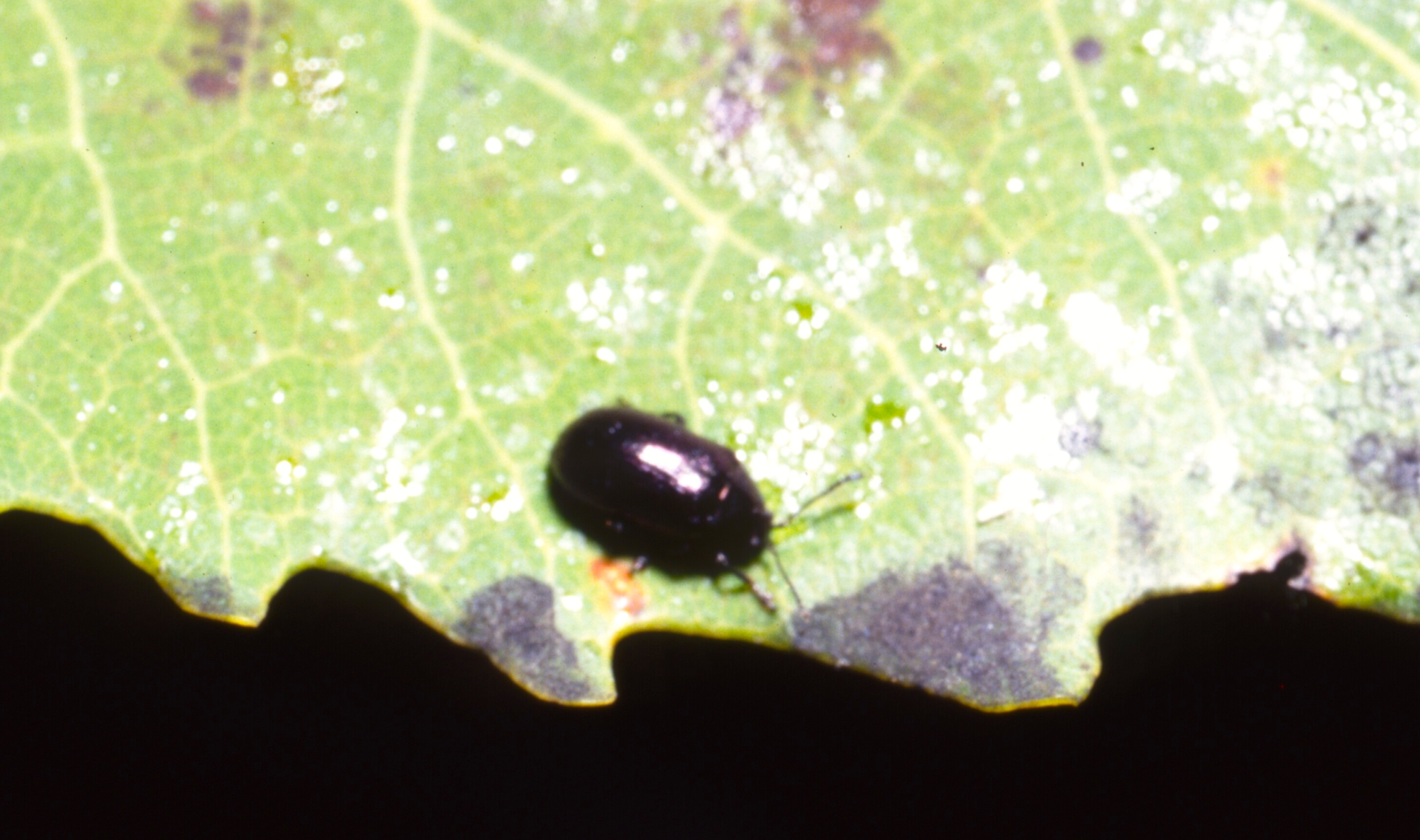

Scientific classification
- Kingdom: Animalia
- Phylum: Arthropoda
- Clade: Pancrustacea
- Class: Insecta
- Order: Coleoptera
- Suborder: Polyphaga
- Infraorder: Cucujiformia
- Family: Chrysomelidae
- Genus: Phratora
- Species: P. purpurea

Binomial name
- Phratora purpurea Brown, 1951

= Phratora purpurea =

Species of beetle

Phratora purpurea, the aspen skeletonizer, is a species of leaf beetle in the family Chrysomelidae. It is found across North America, including Maryland, New York, Ontario, British Columbia, and the Northwest Territories. It feeds on willows and poplars (Populus tremuloides, Populus grandidentata, Populus balsamifera, and Salix fragilis), and is deep purple or coppery red in color.

Cavey (1994) provided detailed notes on the life history of populations of Phratora purpurea subsp. purpurea in Maryland. These notes describe life history patterns that have also been observed in other Phratora species. Adults emerged from overwintering in spring and were actively mating and laying eggs in mid-June. They disappear as eggs and larvae appear. Eggs are laid in clutches of 6–15, arranged in two rows on the underside of host plant leaves (in this case P. grandidentata). When larvae hatch, they feed in groups side by side in a single row during their first instar (molt), and then feed in smaller groups or solitarily in the second and third instar. When they pupate, they leave the host plant and presumably find a site in the soil until the adult emerges in late summer.

== Subspecies ==
These two subspecies belong to the species Phratora purpurea:

- Phratora purpurea novaeterrae Brown, 1951
- Phratora purpurea purpurea Brown, 1951
