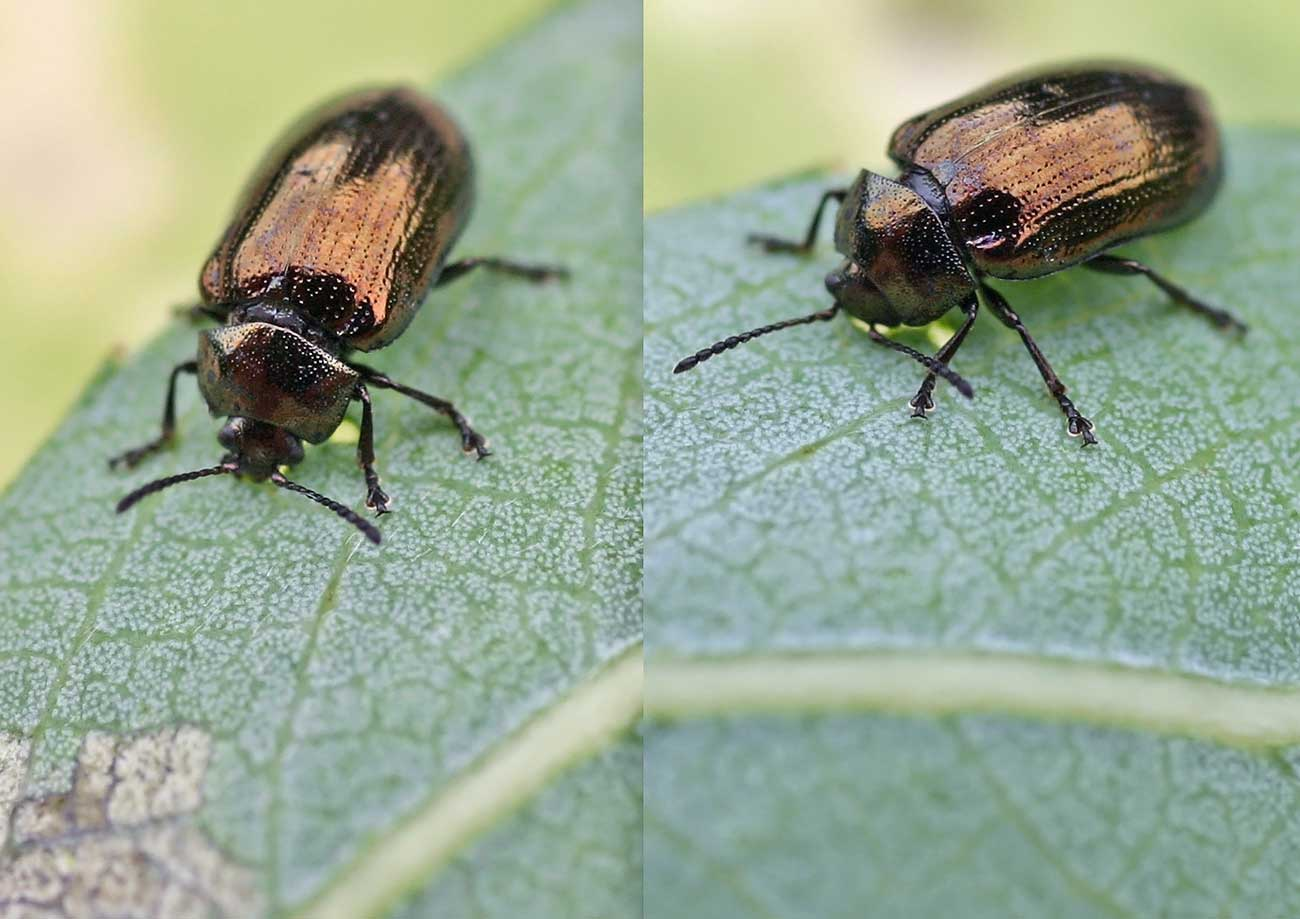

Scientific classification
- Kingdom: Animalia
- Phylum: Arthropoda
- Clade: Pancrustacea
- Class: Insecta
- Order: Coleoptera
- Suborder: Polyphaga
- Infraorder: Cucujiformia
- Family: Chrysomelidae
- Genus: Phratora
- Species: P. vulgatissima

Binomial name
- Phratora vulgatissima (Linnaeus, 1758)

= Blue willow beetle =

Species of beetle

The blue willow beetle (Phratora vulgatissima), formerly Phyllodecta vulgatissima, is a herbivorous beetle of the family Chrysomelidae. It is dark with a metallic sheen that ranges from a blue color to bronze. It is distinguished from P. vitellinae by the latter more commonly displaying bronze coloration. European Phratora species can be distinguished based on morphology of female genitalia. The larvae undergo three instar stages from hatching to pupation. This beetle is found throughout Europe and Scandinavia, and occurs in China.

== Ecology ==
The blue willow beetle is found on willow (Salix) species, whose leaves contain low levels of salicylates in fens, carrs and on river banks, but also often in willow short rotation coppice and other agricultural landscapes. It often aggregates on host plants. On Salix cinerea, it prefers and is more common on female than male trees despite higher egg predation exerted by the common flowerbug Anthocoris nemorum on female trees. It is univoltine in Sweden but can produce multiple generations per year in other parts of its distribution range. Proliferation of larvae and egg production varies with vegetation. It overwinters under lichens on trees and under tree bark. Predators of blue willow beetle eggs include A. nemorum and Orthotylus marginalis. Larval predators include A. nemorum, the bug Rhacognathus punctatus, a syrphid fly (possibly Parasyrphus nigritarsis) and the wasp Symmorphus bifasciatus. Adult beetles are parasitized by the wasp Perilitus brevicollis and consumed by R. punctatus.

== As a pest ==
In Europe, the blue willow beetle can become a severe herbivore pest on willows. For plantations of common osier (Salix viminalis), herbivory reducing biomass production by up to 40% has been estimated. It is susceptible to Bacillus thuringiensis tenebrionis and also Spinosad when treatment is applied to affected plants.
