= Phratora hudsonia =

Scientific classification
- Kingdom: Animalia
- Phylum: Arthropoda
- Clade: Pancrustacea
- Class: Insecta
- Order: Coleoptera
- Suborder: Polyphaga
- Infraorder: Cucujiformia
- Family: Chrysomelidae
- Genus: Phratora
- Species: P. hudsonia

Binomial name
- Phratora hudsonia Brown, 1951

Species of beetle

Phratora hudsonia, the birch leaf beetle, is a species of leaf beetle in the family Chrysomelidae. It is found in North America. This species is known from Canadian populations at the Great Slave Lake and north shore of Lake Superior. It feeds on birch and is metallic brown in color. It is relatively small in size, like other Phratora species.
