= Phratora frosti =

Scientific classification
- Kingdom: Animalia
- Phylum: Arthropoda
- Clade: Pancrustacea
- Class: Insecta
- Order: Coleoptera
- Suborder: Polyphaga
- Infraorder: Cucujiformia
- Family: Chrysomelidae
- Genus: Phratora
- Species: P. frosti

Binomial name
- Phratora frosti Brown, 1951

Species of beetle

Phratora frosti is a species of leaf beetle in the family Chrysomelidae. This species is known from Nova Scotia to Alberta. It feeds on willow species and varies in color from blue to purple to coppery, with pale legs.
