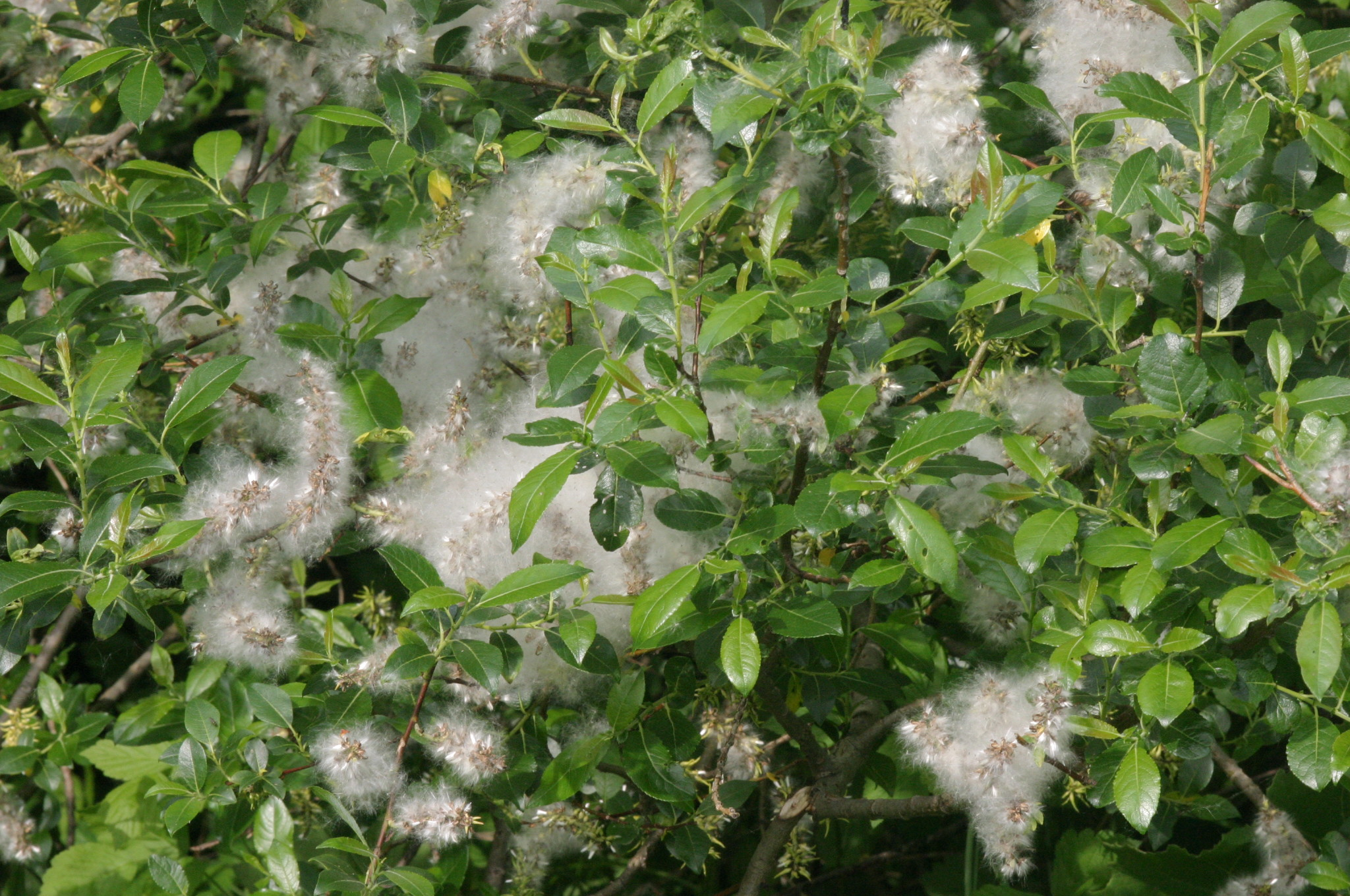

Conservation status
- Least Concern (IUCN 3.1)

Scientific classification
- Kingdom: Plantae
- Clade: Tracheophytes
- Clade: Angiosperms
- Clade: Eudicots
- Clade: Rosids
- Order: Malpighiales
- Family: Salicaceae
- Genus: Salix
- Species: S. myrsinifolia

Binomial name
- Salix myrsinifolia Salisb.

Synonyms
- List: Salix amaniana Willd.; Salix andersoniana Sm.; Salix ansoniana J.Forbes; Salix atropurpurea J.Forbes; Salix atrovirens J.Forbes; Salix australis Schleich. ex Spreng.; Salix carpinifolia Schleich. ex Spreng.; Salix coriacea J.Forbes; Salix cotinifolia Sm.; Salix crassifolia J.Forbes; Salix damascena J.Forbes; Salix firma J.Forbes; Salix forsteriana Sm.; Salix glaucescens Host; Salix grisonensis J.Forbes; Salix grisophylla J.Forbes; Salix hirta Sm.; Salix lacustris J.Forbes; Salix lithuanica Besser ex Ledeb.; Salix menthifolia Host; Salix nigricans Sm.; Salix nigricans var. borussica Wimm.; Salix nigricans var. crassifolia (Schleich. ex J.Forbes) Wimm.; Salix nigricans var. firma Ser.; Salix nigricans var. lancifolia Wimm.; Salix nigricans var. parvifolia Ser.; Salix nigricans var. rupestris (Donn ex Sm.) Wimm.; Salix nigricans var. sericea Wimm.; Salix ovata Spreng.; Salix parietariifolia Host; Salix petraea G.Anderson ex J.Forbes; Salix proteifolia J.Forbes; Salix ramifusca J.Forbes; Salix rivalis Host; Salix rivularis J.Forbes; Salix rotundata J.Forbes; Salix rupestris Donn ex Sm.; Salix schleicheriana J.Forbes; Salix sordida J.Forbes; Salix stylaris Ser.; Salix tiliifolia Schleich. ex Spreng.; Salix vaudensis J.Forbes; Salix willdenoviana J.Forbes; Sokolofia rupestris (Donn ex Sm.) Raf.; Urnectis hirta (Sm.) Raf.; Vimen andersoniana (Sm.) Raf.; Vimen cotinifolia (Sm.) Raf.; Vimen forsteriana (Sm.) Raf.

= Salix myrsinifolia =

Species of willow

Salix myrsinifolia, known as the dark-leaved willow or myrsine-leaved willow, is a species of willow native to Europe and Western Siberia. It forms a 2–5 m (6.6–16.4 ft) high shrub. In the north, it often becomes a tree up to 8 m (26 ft) tall.
