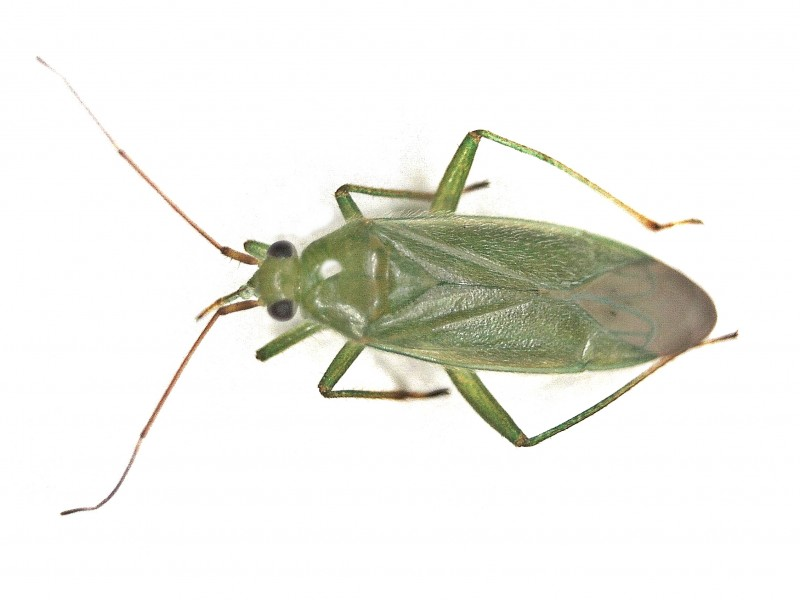

Scientific classification
- Kingdom: Animalia
- Phylum: Arthropoda
- Class: Insecta
- Order: Hemiptera
- Suborder: Heteroptera
- Family: Miridae
- Genus: Orthotylus
- Species: O. marginalis

Binomial name
- Orthotylus marginalis Reuter, 1883

= Orthotylus marginalis =

Species of true bug

Orthotylus marginalis is a species of stinkbugs from the Miridae family that can be found throughout Europe (except for Liechtenstein and various European islands). then east across the Palearctic to Central Asia and Siberia.

== Description ==
Adults are 6 millimetres (0.24 in) long, and are green coloured. Their upper surface is covered with dense pale hairs, with brownish antennas.

== Ecology ==
The species members feed on alder, apple trees, currant, sloe, sallow, and willows. Adults feed on Aphididae, Tetranychidae, and Psyllidae. In some cases, they also feed on plants of pear trees, causing the pears to have stoney pits, among other damages. They are not obligate zoophages.
