= Perilitus =

Scientific classification
- Kingdom: Animalia
- Phylum: Arthropoda
- Class: Insecta
- Order: Hymenoptera
- Family: Braconidae
- Genus: Perilitus (Nees, 1818)

Genus of wasps

Perilitus is a genus of wasps.
