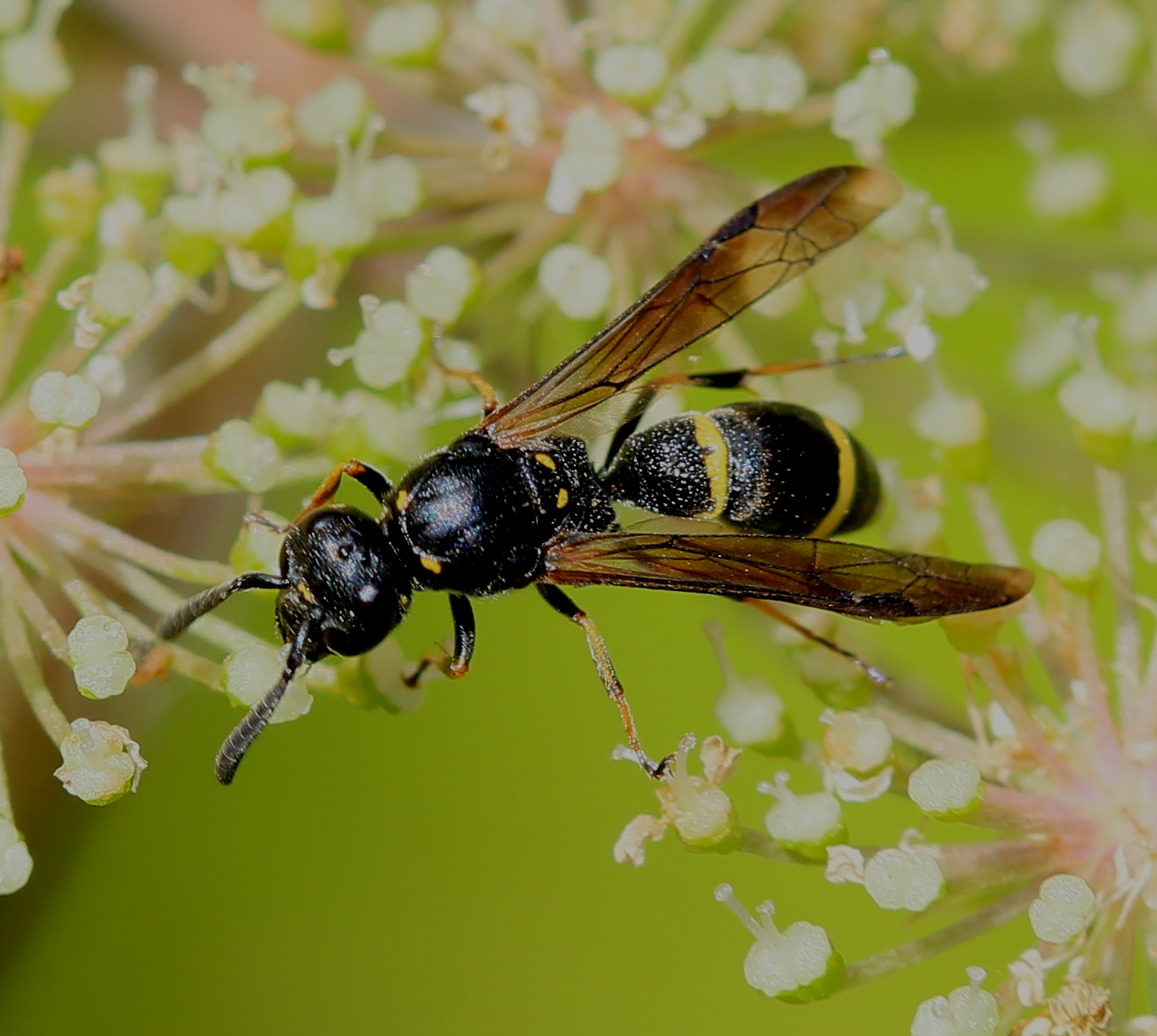

Scientific classification
- Kingdom: Animalia
- Phylum: Arthropoda
- Class: Insecta
- Order: Hymenoptera
- Family: Vespidae
- Genus: Symmorphus
- Species: S. bifasciatus

Binomial name
- Symmorphus bifasciatus (Linnaeus, 1761)

Synonyms
- Vespa bifasciata Linnaeus, 1761; Vespa sinuata Fabricius, 1793; Odynerus sinuatus var. mutinensis Baldini, 1894; Symmorphus sparsus Morawitz, 1895; Symmorphus sinuatissimus Richards, 1935; Symmorphus mutinensis (Baldini, 1894); Symmorphus mutinensis auster Giordani Soika, 1975; Symmorphus mutinensis yezoanus Tsuneki, 1977

= Symmorphus bifasciatus =

Species of wasp

Symmorphus bifasciatus, the willow mason-wasp, is a species of potter wasp, from the subfamily Eumeninae of the social wasp family Vespidae which is widely distributed in the Palearctic region.

== Description ==
Symmorphus bifasciatus is one of the two small Symmorphus species found in Britain which have a transverse ridge along the front edge of the pronotum. It is distinguished from the other Symmorphus connexus by having denser punctures on the mesonotum, mesopleuron and frons, and because it normally shows yellow patches on the pronotum and scutellum.

== Distribution ==
Symmorphus bifasciatus is found from Great Britain, as far north as Highland in northern Scotland, east to north eastern Siberia, Korea and Japan, south to Central Asia.

== Biology ==
Symmorphus bifasciatus is a tube-nesting wasp, utilising existing cavities including the hollow stems of plants and the disused plant galls of Cynips kollari, where the female wasp constructs a number of cells, separated from each other by walls made of clay. S. bifasciatus hunts for the larvae of the leaf beetle Phyllodecta vulgatissima, which are immobilised by stinging and carried back to the nest by the mandibles and forelegs to supply the cells. Once there is sufficient food in the cell, usually between 10 and 17 grubs which are tightly packed, the female lays an egg in the cell. The egg hatches in two or three days after laying, while the larvae mature in one or two weeks undergoing a probable five instars. Once the larve has finished feeding it may rest for around one day before it voids its gut contents towards the inner end of the cell and then spins a cocoon which it fixes to the base of the cell. The flight period is from May to October; but activity peaks between June and August, but they are especially active in July. Adults are known to feed on the nectar of figwort, Apiaceae and spurge.

The cuckoo wasps Chrysis angustula and Chrysis ignita have been recorded as brood parasites of Symmorphus bifasciatus in Europe.
