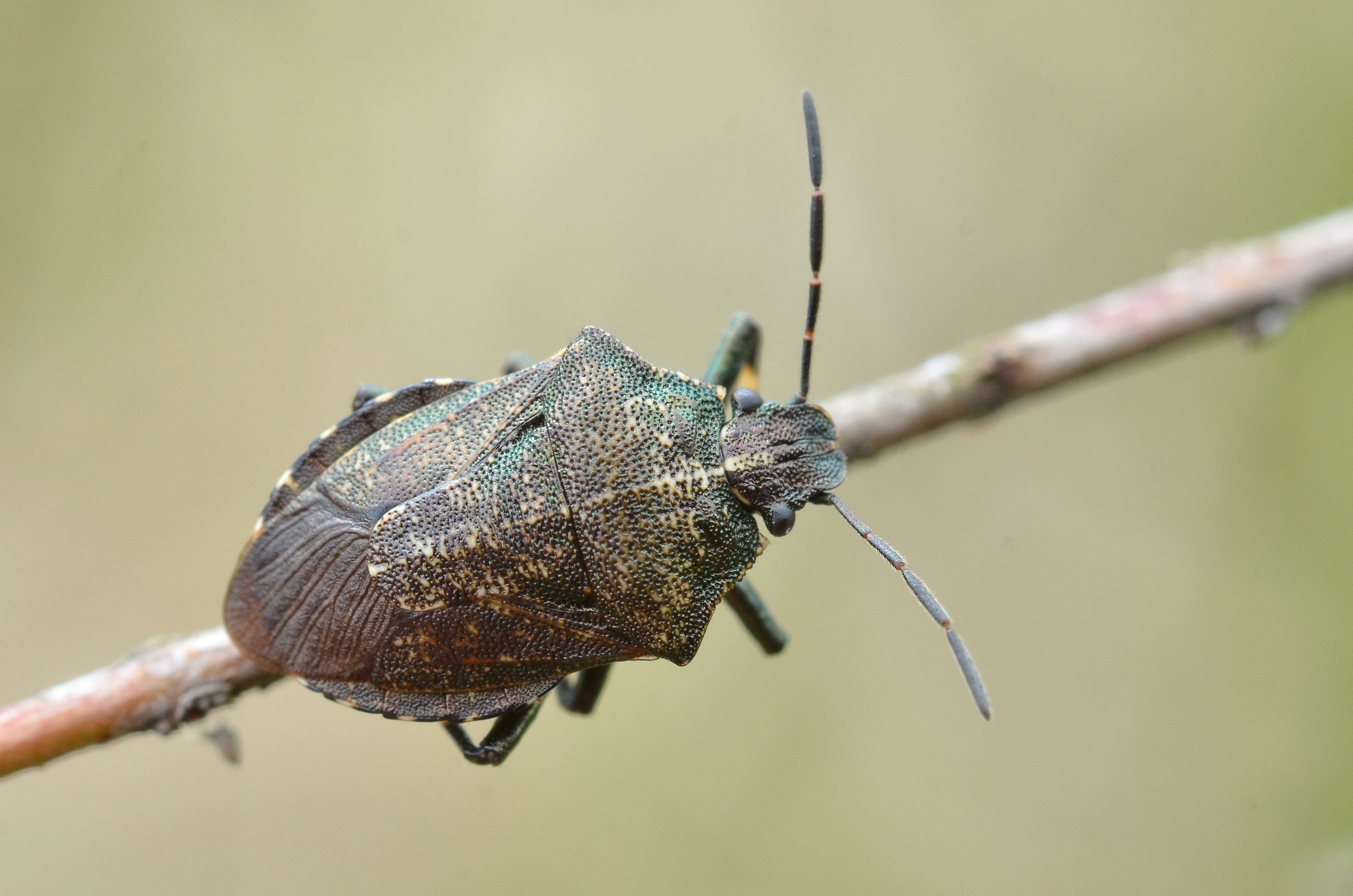
- Rhacognathus punctatus, imago
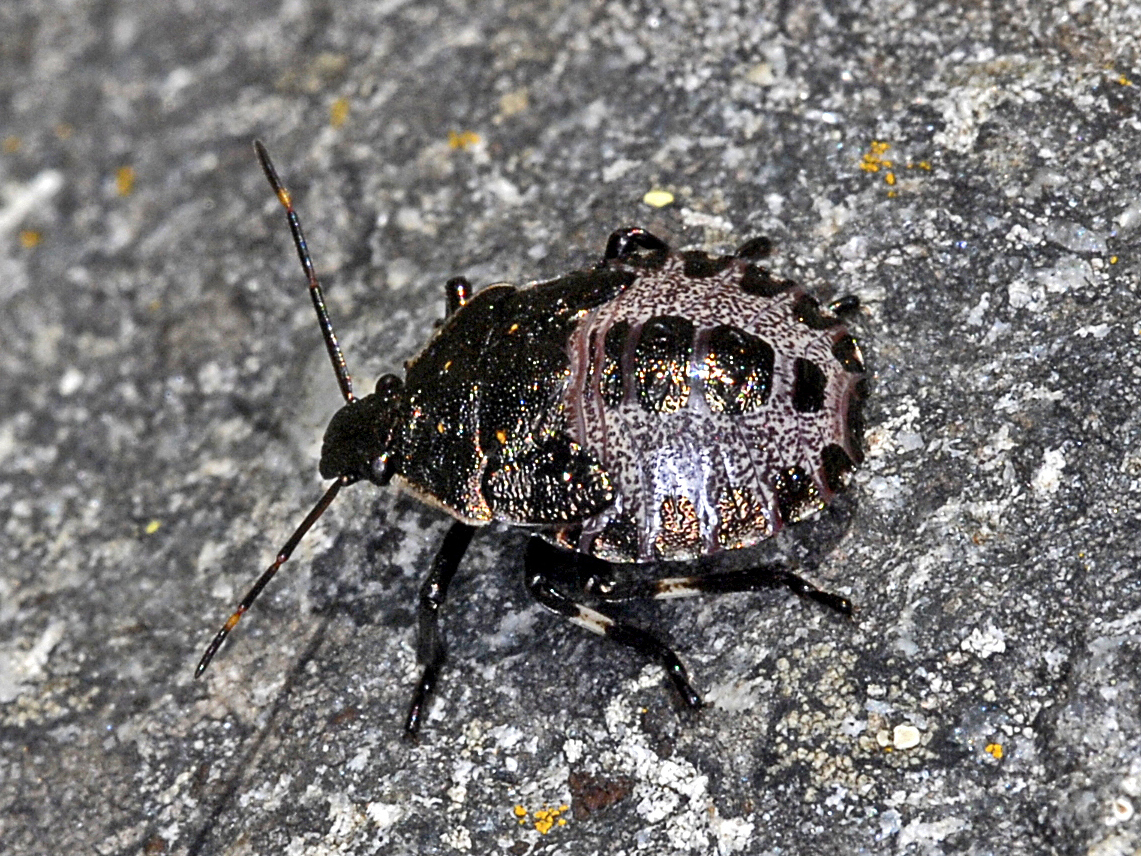
- Rhacognathus punctatus, nymph

Scientific classification
- Kingdom: Animalia
- Phylum: Arthropoda
- Clade: Pancrustacea
- Class: Insecta
- Order: Hemiptera
- Suborder: Heteroptera
- Family: Pentatomidae
- Genus: Rhacognathus
- Species: R. punctatus

Binomial name
- Rhacognathus punctatus (Linnaeus, 1758)

Synonyms
- Rhacognathus distinctus Schouteden, 1907; Cimex avenicola Gistel, 1857; Cimex annularis Geoffroy, 1785; Cimex variegatus Goeze, 1778; Eysarcoris punctatus (Linnaeus, 1758); Cimex punctatus Linnaeus, 1758

= Rhacognathus punctatus =

Species of true bug

Rhacognathus punctatus, the heather bug, is a species of stink bugs (family Pentatomidae).

== Description ==
Rhacognathus punctatus can reach a length of 7–9 millimetres (0.28–0.35 in). This predatory stink bug has a mottled metallic bronze-brown shieldbug, extended shoulders, a pale longitudinal line on the pronotum and dark brown legs with a whitish band on the tibia. Females lay their eggs in May and June, while the adults are present throughout the year. Adults of these bugs prey on the larvae of leaf beetles and Chrysomelidae species, especially on the larvae of Lochmaea caprea and Lochmaea suturalis.

== Distribution ==
This species is present in most of Europe.

== Habitat ==
This stink bug prefers the edges of heaths, moors and lowland mires.
