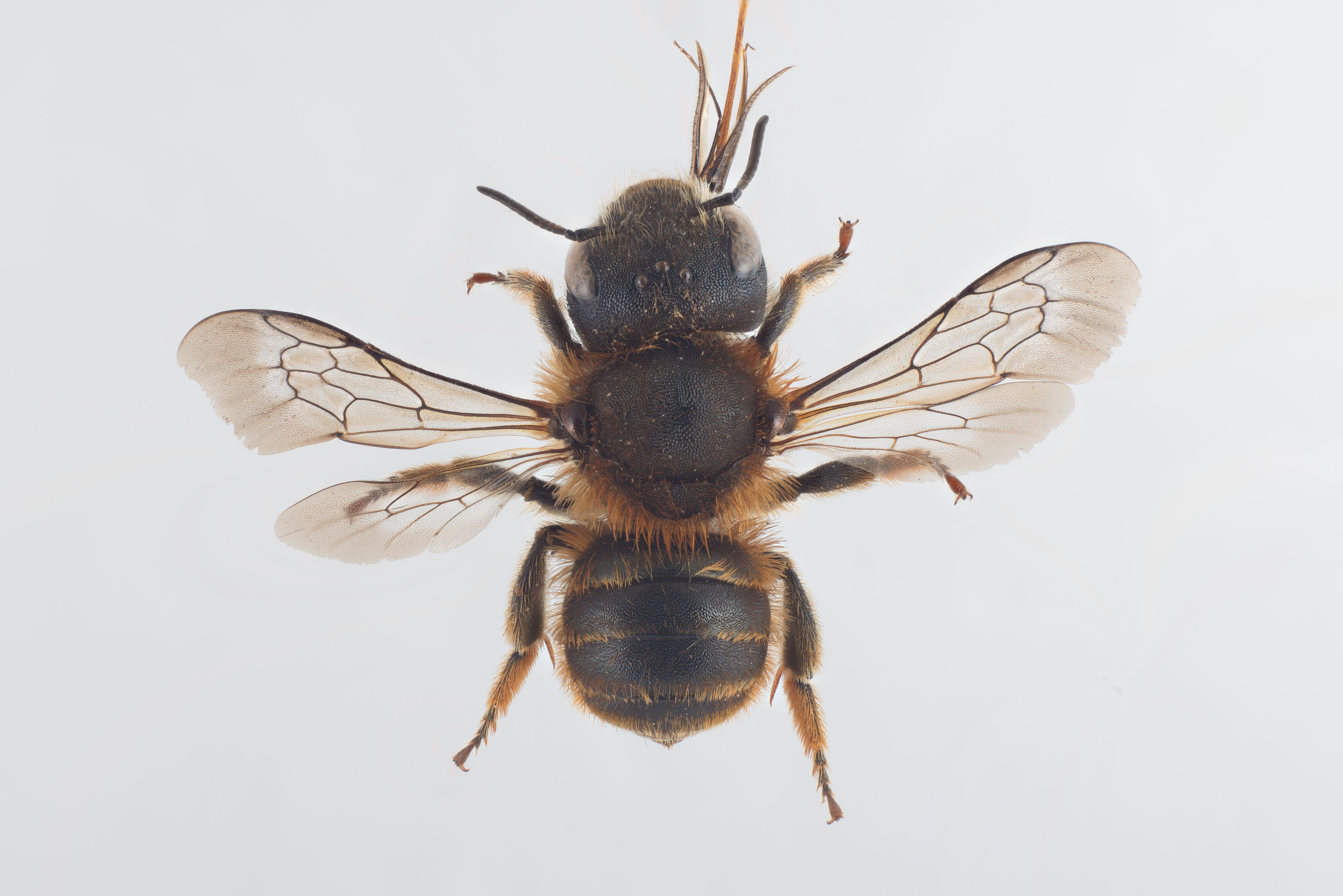
- Osmia aurulenta Norway

Scientific classification
- Kingdom: Animalia
- Phylum: Arthropoda
- Class: Insecta
- Order: Hymenoptera
- Family: Megachilidae
- Subfamily: Megachilinae
- Tribe: Osmiini
- Genus: Osmia
- Species: O. aurulenta

Binomial name
- Osmia aurulenta (Panzer, 1799)

= Osmia aurulenta =

Species of bee

Osmia aurulenta is a Palearctic species of mason bee.

== Description ==
8–10 mm. Males in the field cannot be distinguished from similar Osmia species, especially when they are older. Females in a fresh state may be confused with the slimmer Osmia rufohirta due to the bright rust-red hairs of the thorax, the rust-red narrow tergite bandages and the rust-red belly brush. Females that are old are similar to Osmia tridentata.

== Range ==
From Portugal through Europe and Asia Minor to the Caucasus; north to Ireland and southern Scotland, to 59.5° N in Norway, 58° N in Sweden, in Russia to Udmurtia; south to Sicily, Greece and Lebanon.

== Habitat ==
On calcareous subsoil. Inland dunes, rocky slopes, extensively grazed or fallow sheep pastures (juniper heaths), old fallow vineyards, structurally rich forest edges, abandoned quarries, in the limestone low mountain ranges also stony and sparsely overgrown road embankments, there occasionally also in the settlement area. From the lowlands to the montane, in southern Switzerland to the subalpine altitude.

== Ecology ==
The flight period ranges in a generation from March to July, beginning of March to the beginning of September in Switzerland.

Polylectic with preference for Fabaceae. So far, the use of the pollen of the six plant families Asteraceae, Boraginaceae, Cistaceae, Fabaceae, Lamiaceae and Plantaginaceae has been proven.

Nests in empty, medium-sized to large snail shells, preferred are those of Helix pomatia. In the medium-sized houses there are only 1–4 cells lying one behind the other, in snail shells the cells are next to each other in the front area. The dividing walls of the cells and the nest closure are made from chewed pieces of Fragaria, Helianthemum and others. The outer wall of the snail shell is covered with plant mortar like a camouflage net. After completion of the nest closure, the snail shell – in contrast to Osmia bicolor, for example – is no longer moved.

Parasites: Cuckoo bee is Stelis punctulatissima. The wasps Sapyga quinquepunctata, Chrysura trimaculata, Chrysura cuprea, Chrysis hirsuta and Chrysura dichroa and wasps of the genus Pteromalus are known as parasites.

== Etymology ==
From Latin "aurum" = "gold"; because of the red and gold hair.

== Taxonomy ==
Subgenus Helicosmia THOMSON, 1872

Synonym: Osmia tunensis aurulenta (PANZER, 1799).
