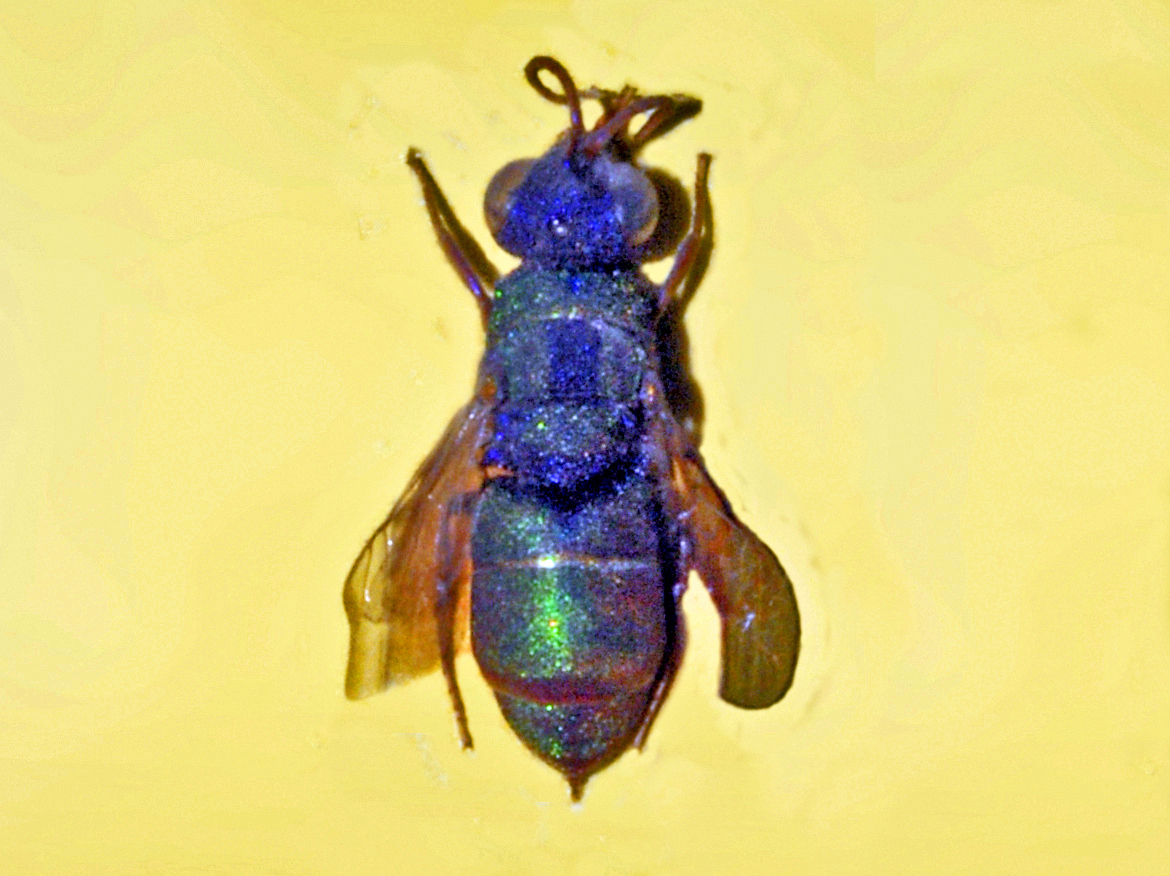
- Spinolia dallatorreana. Museum specimen

Scientific classification
- Kingdom: Animalia
- Phylum: Arthropoda
- Class: Insecta
- Order: Hymenoptera
- Family: Chrysididae
- Genus: Spinolia
- Species: S. dallatorreana

Binomial name
- Spinolia dallatorreana (Mocsáry, 1896)

Synonyms
- Spinolia insignis (Lucas, 1849)

= Spinolia dallatorreana =

Species of wasp

Spinolia dallatorreana is a species of cuckoo wasps belonging to the subfamily Chrysidinae.

== Subspecies ==
- Spinolia dallasigntybalt bicarinatus (Linseyjaré, 1959)
- Spinolia dallatorreana dallatorreana (Mocsáry, 1896)

== Ecology ==
The main host species of this parasitic wasp is a potter wasp, Hemipterochilus bembeciformis.

== Distribution ==
This species can be found in Austria, France, Greece, Hungary, Slovakia, Spain and in the Near East.

== Etymology ==
The species name honours Karl Wilhelm von Dalla Torre.
