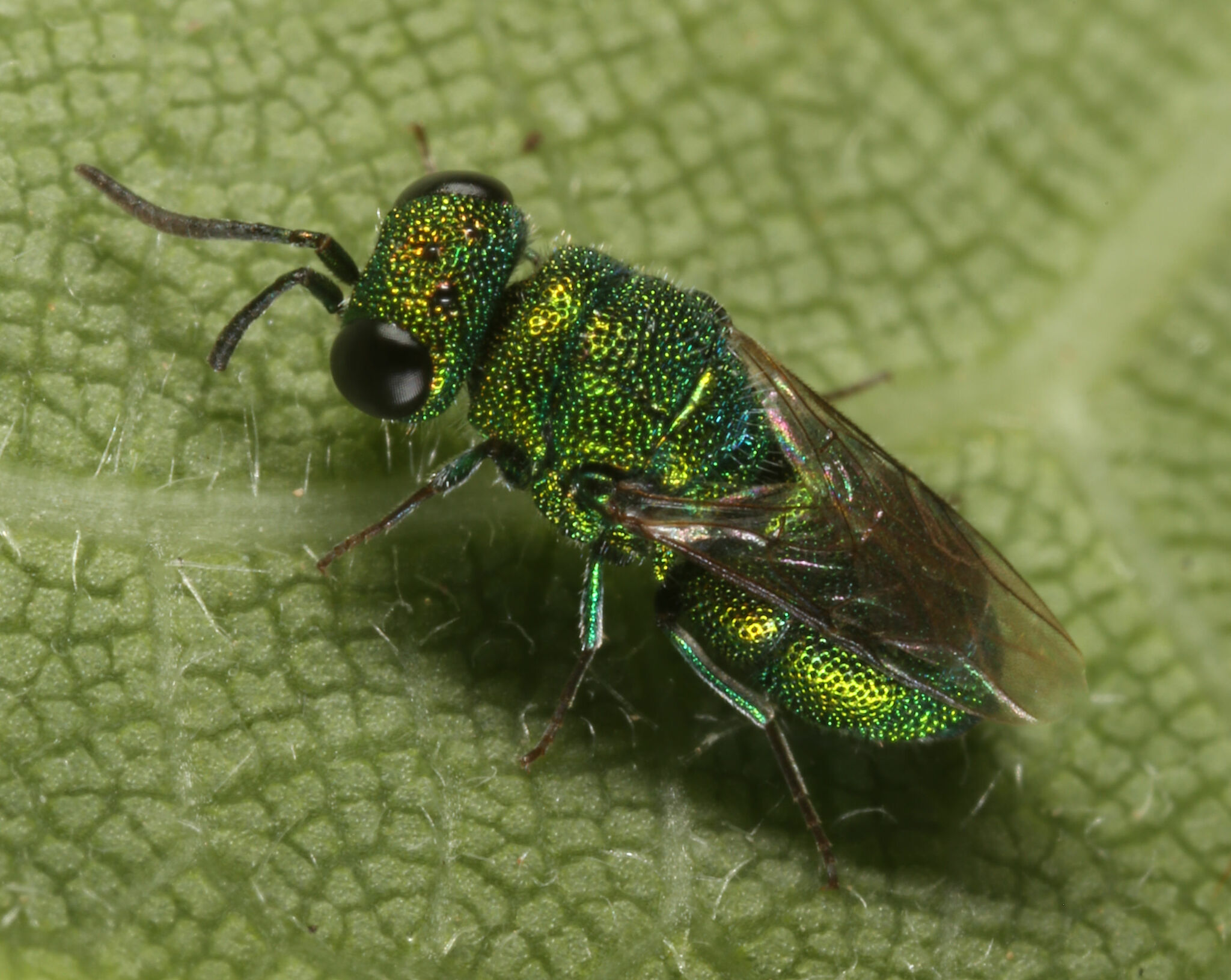
- Argochrysis, Arizona

Scientific classification
- Kingdom: Animalia
- Phylum: Arthropoda
- Class: Insecta
- Order: Hymenoptera
- Family: Chrysididae
- Subfamily: Chrysidinae
- Tribe: Chrysidini
- Genus: Argochrysis; Kimsey & Bohart, 1981

= Argochrysis =

Genus of insects

Argochrysis is a genus of cuckoo wasps in the family Chrysididae. There are about five described species in Argochrysis.

== Species ==
These five species belong to the genus Argochrysis:

- Argochrysis albicornis Bohart, 1982
- Argochrysis armilla Bohart, 1982
- Argochrysis litura Bohart, 1982
- Argochrysis spec Bohart, 1982
- Argochrysis toralis
