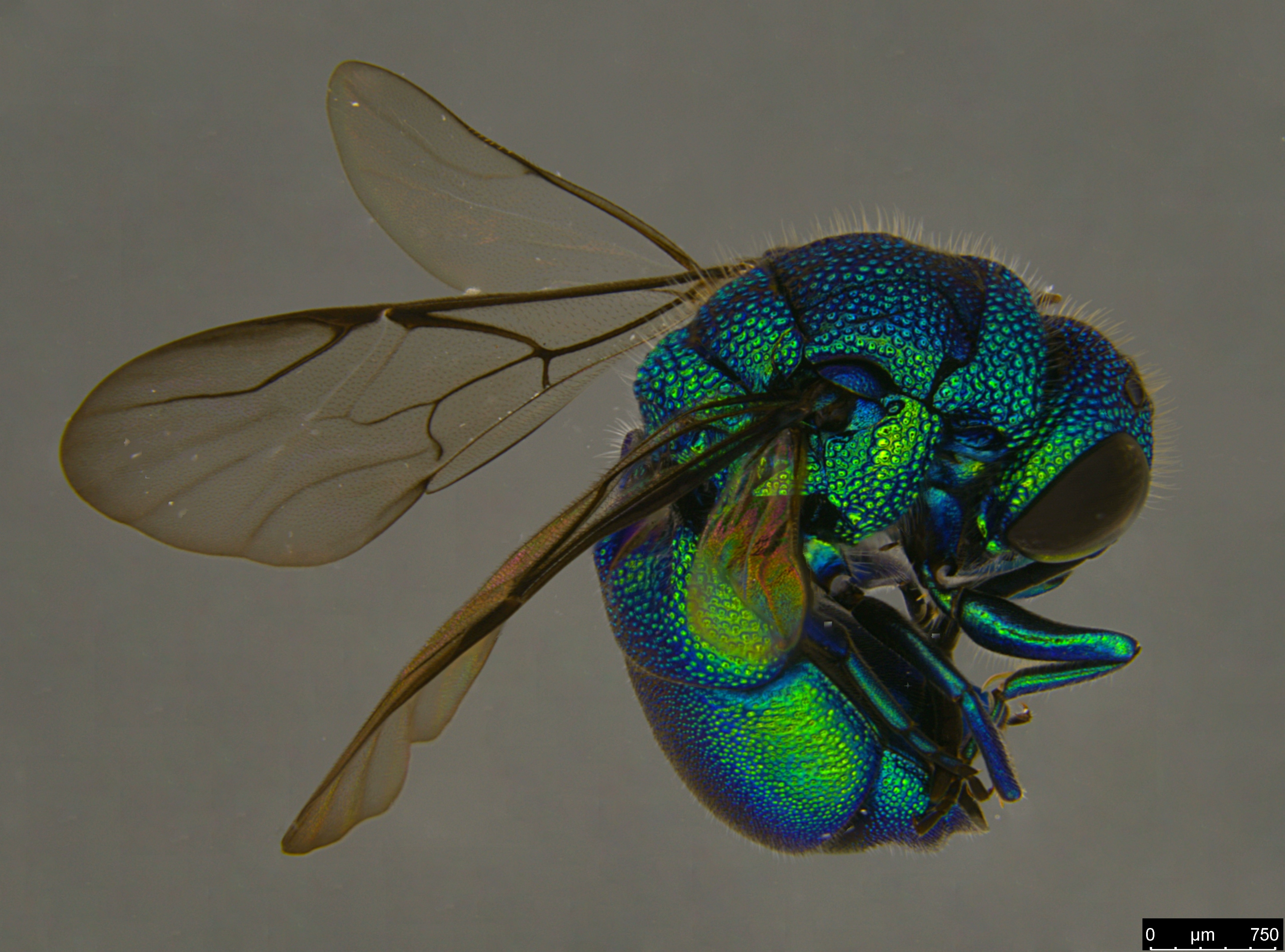

Scientific classification
- Kingdom: Animalia
- Phylum: Arthropoda
- Class: Insecta
- Order: Hymenoptera
- Family: Chrysididae
- Subfamily: Chrysidinae
- Tribe: Chrysidini
- Genus: Primeuchroeus; Linsenmaier, 1968

= Primeuchroeus =

Genus of cuckoo wasps

Primeuchroeus is a genus of cuckoo wasps found in Australia. The genus contains about 20 species. Like all cuckoo wasps, they are brood parasites.
