= Pleurochrysis =

Pleurochrysis is the scientific name of two genera of organisms and may refer to:

- Pleurochrysis (haptophyte)
- Pleurochrysis (wasp)
