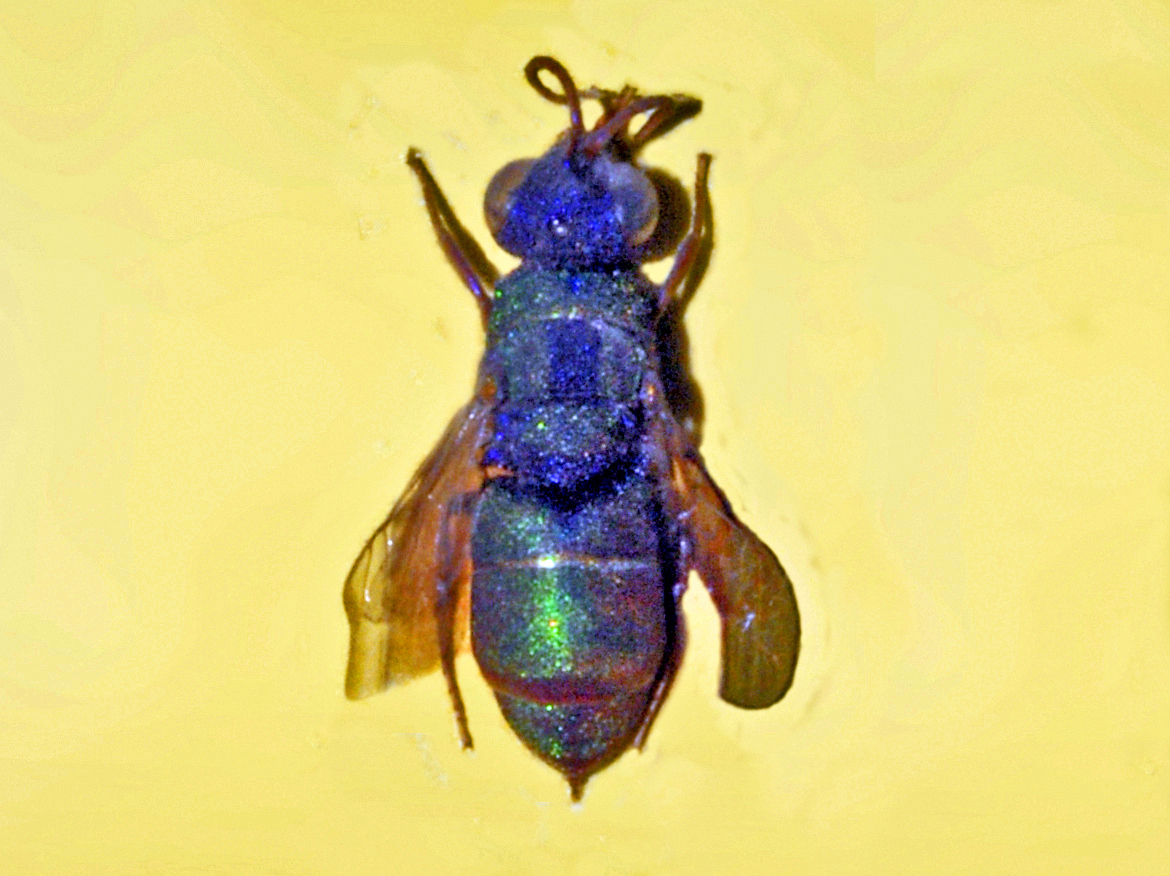
- Spinolia dallatorreana

Scientific classification
- Kingdom: Animalia
- Phylum: Arthropoda
- Class: Insecta
- Order: Hymenoptera
- Family: Chrysididae
- Tribe: Chrysidini
- Genus: Spinolia; Dahlbom, 1854

Type species
- Spinolia magnifica Dahlbom, 1854

= Spinolia =

Genus of wasps

Spinolia is a genus of cuckoo wasps belonging to the subfamily Chrysidinae. The name honours Maximilian Spinola.

== Species ==
Species within this genus include:

- Spinolia dallatorreana
- Spinolia dournovi
- Spinolia hibera
- Spinolia lamprosoma
- Spinolia rogenhoferi
- Spinolia schmidti
- Spinolia unicolor
