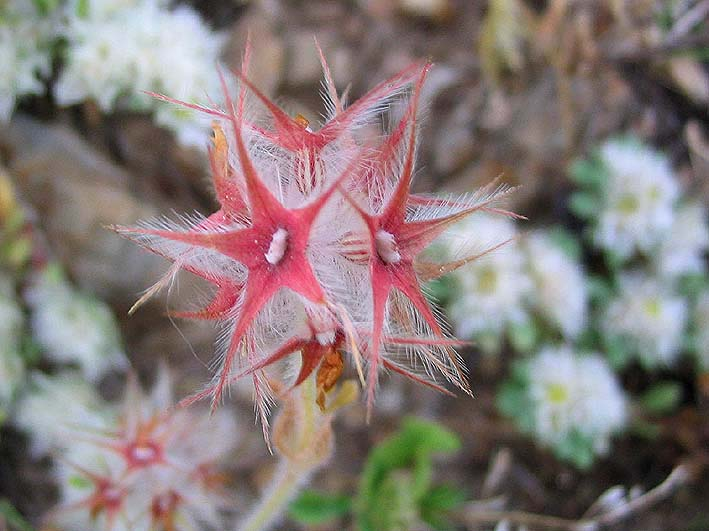

Scientific classification
- Kingdom: Plantae
- Clade: Tracheophytes
- Clade: Angiosperms
- Clade: Eudicots
- Clade: Rosids
- Order: Fabales
- Family: Fabaceae
- Subfamily: Faboideae
- Genus: Trifolium
- Species: T. stellatum

Binomial name
- Trifolium stellatum L.

= Trifolium stellatum =

Species of plant

Trifolium stellatum, the star clover, is a species of annual herb in the family Fabaceae. They have a self-supporting growth form and compound, broad leaves. Flowers are visited by mason bees, Anthocopa, Osmia aurulenta, and Anthophora. Individuals can grow to 0.11 m.

== Sources ==
This article incorporates text from a free content work. Licensed under CC0 (license statement/permission). Text taken from Trifolium stellatum. Encyclopedia of Life.
