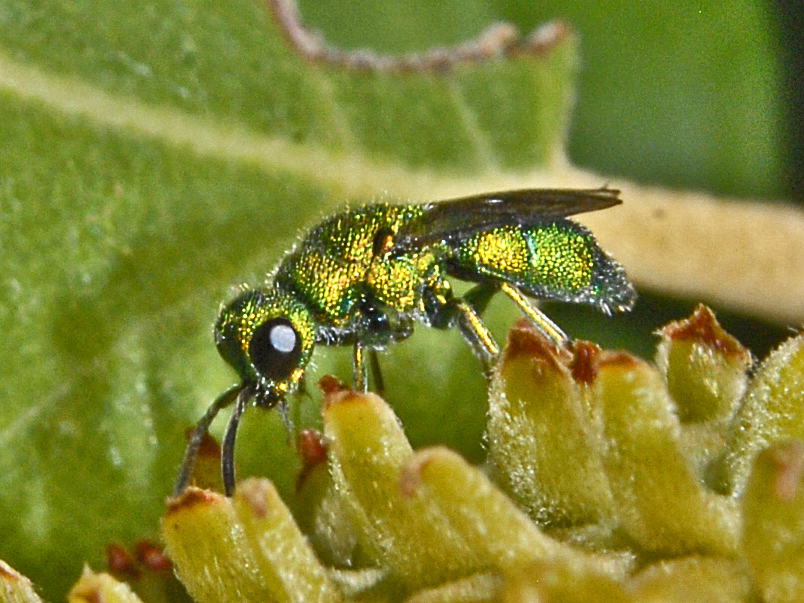
- Chrysidea pumila

Scientific classification
- Kingdom: Animalia
- Phylum: Arthropoda
- Class: Insecta
- Order: Hymenoptera
- Family: Chrysididae
- Tribe: Chrysidini
- Genus: Chrysidea; Bischoff, 1913

Type species
- Chrysidea pumila Klug, 1845

= Chrysidea =

Genus of wasps

Chrysidea is a genus of cuckoo wasps (insect belonging to the family Chrysididae).

== Taxonomy ==
Chrysidea and Trichrysis are closely related and probably they should be considered the same genus. For example, some authors consider the species Chrysidea pumila as a synonym of Trichrysis pumilionis Linsenmaier, 1987.

This genus includes small species, from 3 to 6 mm, with variable colors ranging from green and blue-green to blue.

== Species ==
- Chrysidea asensioi (Mingo, 1985)
- Chrysidea persica (Radoszkowski, 1881)
- Chrysidea pumila (Klug 1845) (type species)
