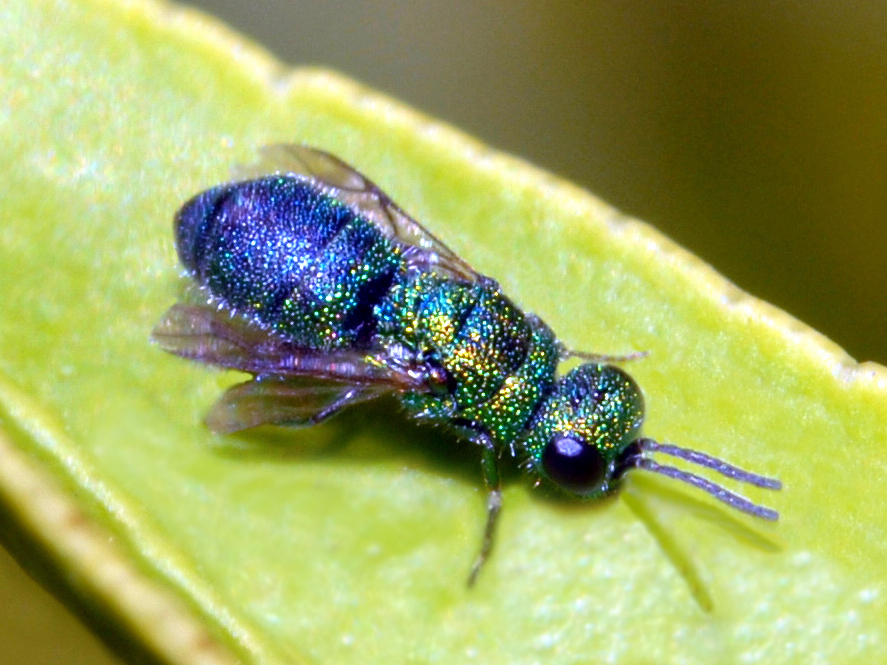
- Chrysidea pumila, dorsal view
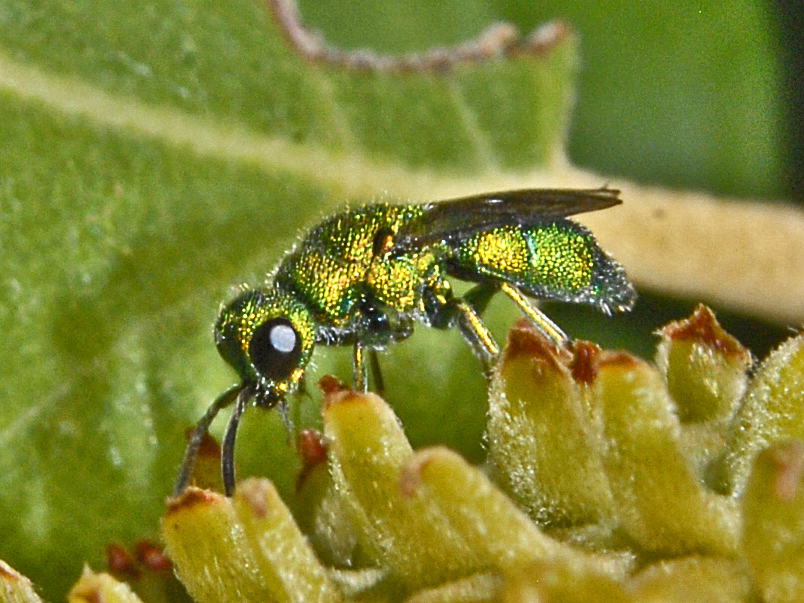
- Chrysidea pumila, lateral view

Scientific classification
- Kingdom: Animalia
- Phylum: Arthropoda
- Class: Insecta
- Order: Hymenoptera
- Family: Chrysididae
- Genus: Chrysidea
- Species: C. pumila

Binomial name
- Chrysidea pumila (Klug, 1845)

= Chrysidea pumila =

Species of wasp

Chrysidea pumila is a species of cuckoo wasps belonging to the subfamily Chrysidinae. Some authors consider this name to be a synonym of Trichrysis pumilionis Linsenmaier, 1987.

== Description ==
Chrysidea pumila can reach a length of about 3.5–6 millimetres (0.14–0.24 in). The basic color of the body is metallic blue-green with golden reflections.

These cuckoo wasps parasitize Trypoxylon attenuatum (Sphecidae).

== Distribution ==
This species is present in Europe (Spain, France, Switzerland, Austria, Germany, Hungary, Dalmatia, North Macedonia, Greece, Italy), in Southern Russia, in the Middle East and in North Africa.
