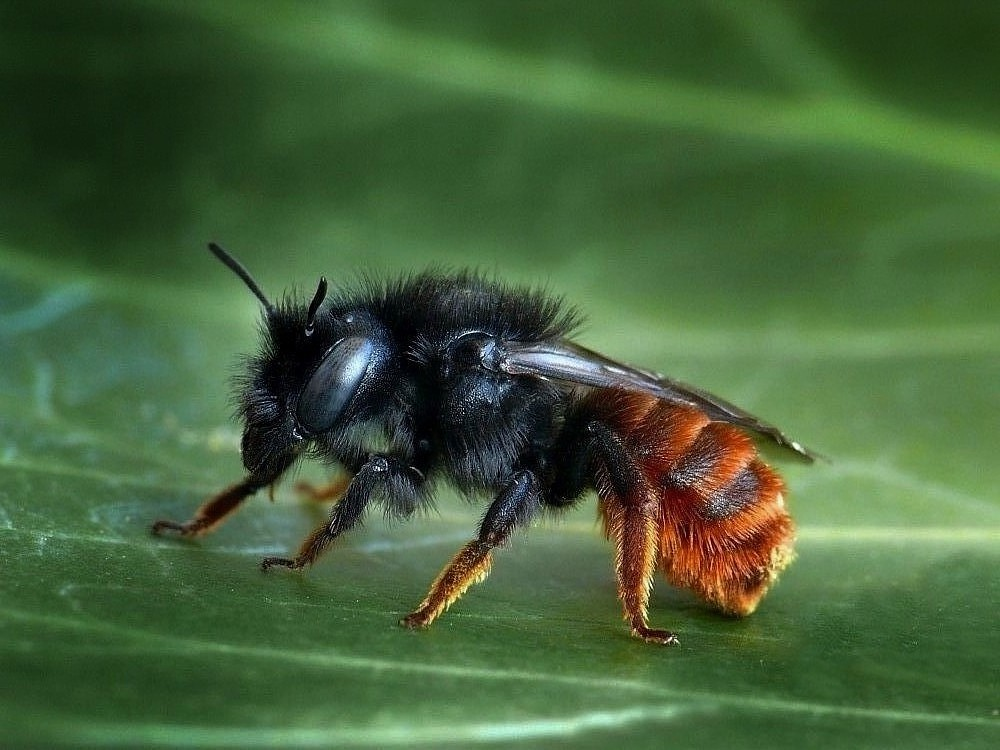

Scientific classification
- Kingdom: Animalia
- Phylum: Arthropoda
- Class: Insecta
- Order: Hymenoptera
- Family: Megachilidae
- Genus: Osmia
- Species: O. bicolor

Binomial name
- Osmia bicolor (Schrank, 1781)

Synonyms
- List: Apis rustica Geoffroy, 1785; Apis fusca Christ, 1791; Apis fuscescens Villers, 1789; Apis hirundinaria Christ. 1791; Osmia pyrenaea Lepeletier, 1841; Osmia fusca (Christ, 1791); Osmia rufitarsis Smith, 1879; Osmia monachiensis Strand, 1917

= Osmia bicolor =

Species of bee

Osmia bicolor, the two-coloured mason-bee, is a Palearctic species of bee in the genus Osmia. It is outstanding amongst other megachilid bees in that it nests in empty snail shells.

== Description ==
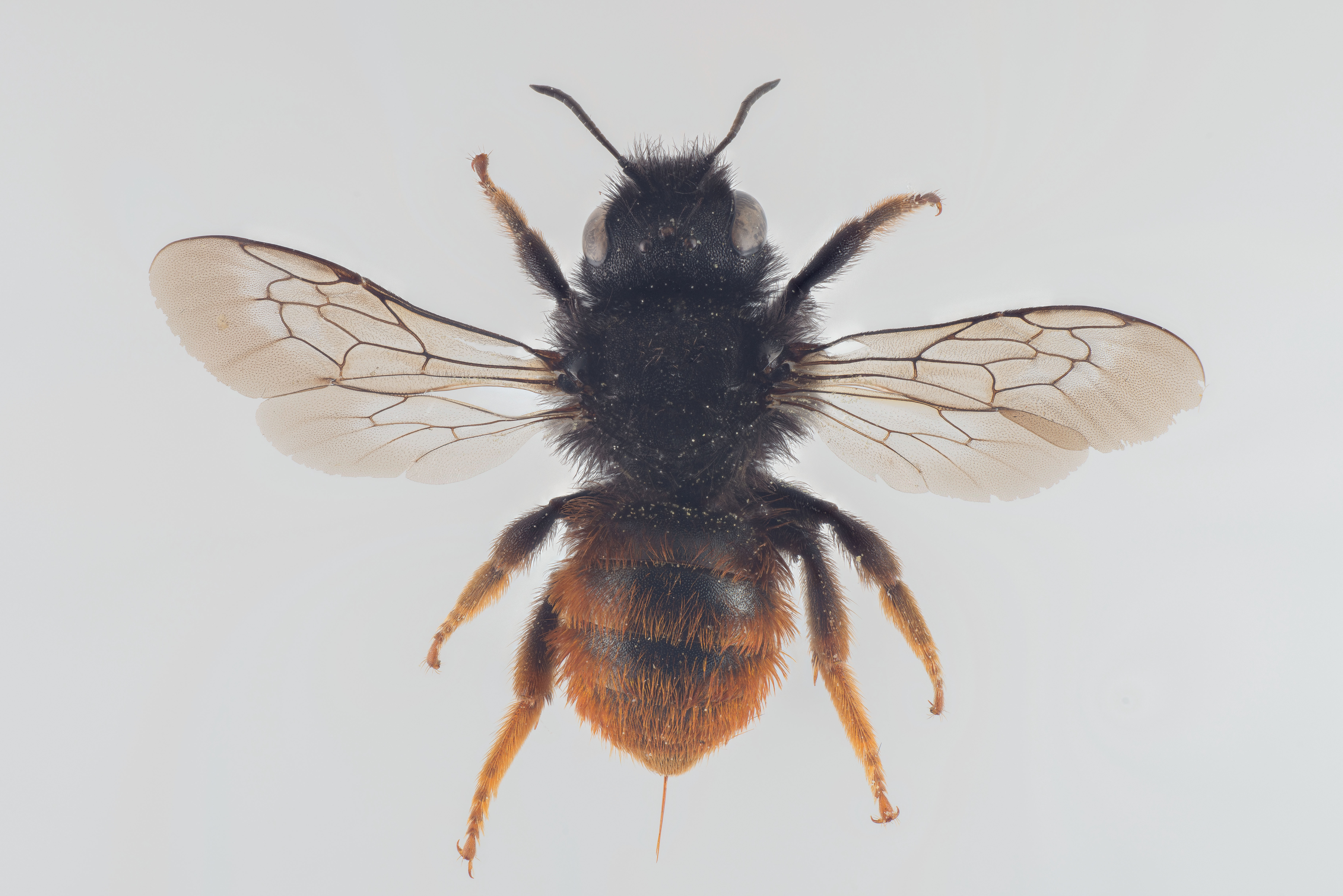
Osmia bicolor

Osmia bicolor females are small bees, 12 mm in length, with a black head and thorax and an abdomen covered in bright ginger hair. In the males the ginger colour of the abdomen is less intense.

== Distribution and habitat ==
Osmia bicolor is found in Europe and western Asia from southern Great Britain in the west east to Turkestan, it is found as far north as southern Scandinavia and Finland, and south as far as Spain and Romania. It occurs in grasslands and open deciduous woodland over calcareous soils underlain by rocks such as limestone and chalk.

== Biology ==
Osmia bicolor is univoltine in western Europe and is among the first bees to emerge in the spring, males can be seen as early as February, although the normal flight period is from April to July. The females emerge a few weeks after the males and are quickly mated. Compared to females the males have a very short life. Once mated the female O. bicolor seeks out the empty shells of snails, In Britain it has been recorded using the shells of Helix pomatia, Cepaea nemoralis, Cepaea hortensis and Monacha cantiana. While in Europe it has also been recorded using the shells of species in the genera Arianta, Crepidula, Fruticicola and Helicella. Once the female has selected a shell she moves into her preferred position before depositing balls consisting of chewed up masticated pollen and nectar to provision the nest. One egg is laid on each ball and the female then builds a cell around the egg and food provision.

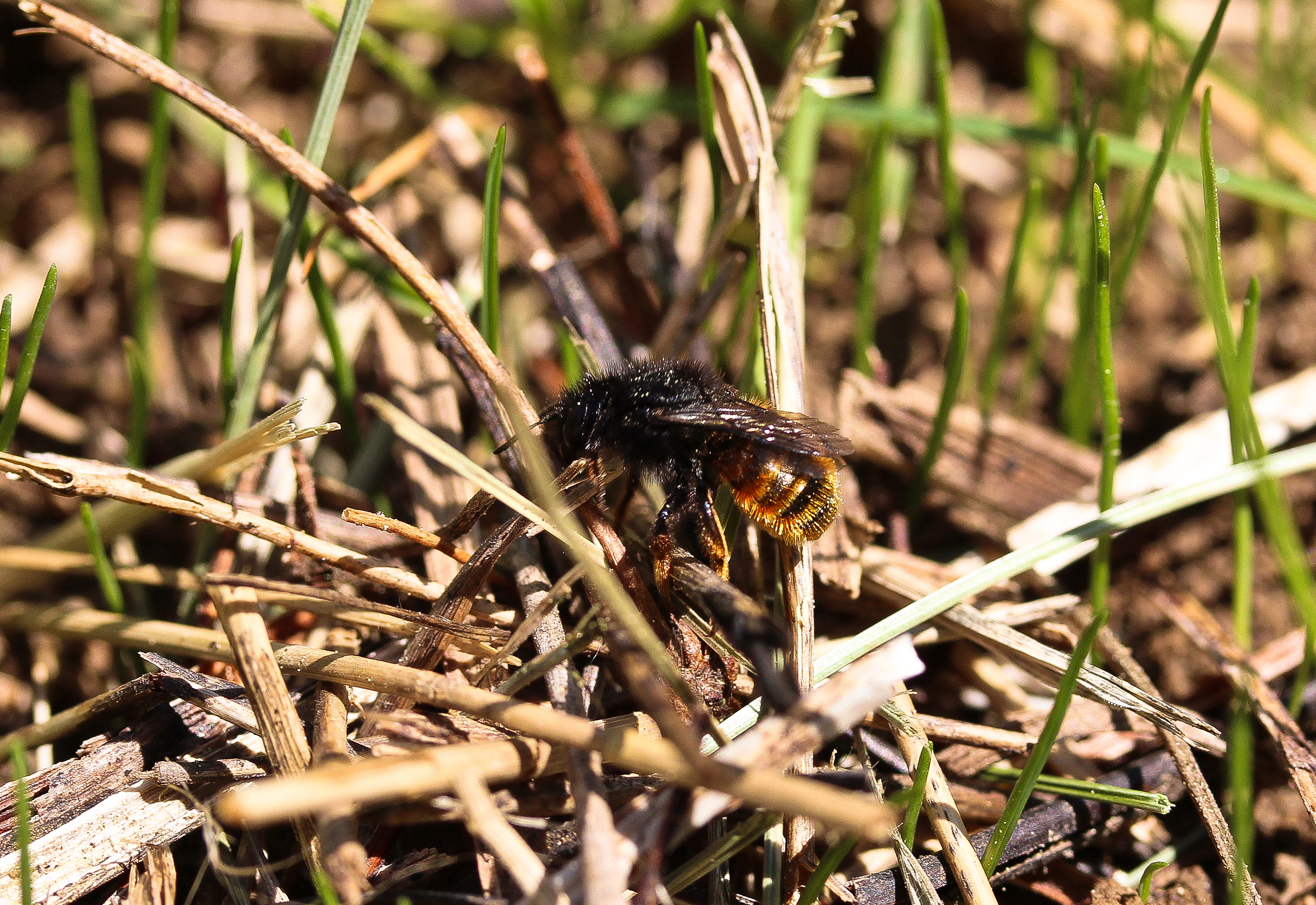
Camouflaging a clutch in a snail shell with blades of grass

Depending on the size of the shell there will be four to five cells per shell and the shell will be sealed with the same type of chewed up leaf material, leaf mastic, as used to create the cells, as well as being speckled on the outside of the shell as camouflage. The female will also deposit sand, gravel and soil between the last cell and the plug as an anti-predator barrier. The shell is then manipulated by the female so that the entrance is facing towards the ground. Once the nest is complete the female covers the shell in a canopy of grass stems, small twigs or leaves to camouflage it. She uses her saliva to bind the canopy materials together. The females are often seen carrying these materials which can be many times the length of the bee. If the soil is soft enough the female may also partially bury the shell. Male O bicolor have been recorded using empty snail shells as shelters during periods of cold or wet weather and at night. The female will make up to six or seven nests in the breeding season. The cuckoo wasp Chrysura refulgens has been recorded as a parasite in the nests of O. bicolor in Italy.

Osmia bicolor is polylectic and uses a wide variety of wildflowers to feed on and to collect pollen and nectar from. In Britain it has been recorded as feeding on wood anemone (Anemonoides nemorosa), common bluebell (Hyacinthoides non-scripta), heath dog-violet (Viola canina), bird's-foot-trefoil (Lotus corniculatus), horseshoe vetch (Hippocrepis comosa), sainfoin (Onobrychis viciifolia), willow (Salix spp.), ground-ivy (Glechoma hederacea), daisy (Bellis perennis) and dandelion (Taraxacum sp.).

== Conservation ==
Osmia bicolor is classified as a nationally notable species in Britain, although it is classified a Least Concern by the International Union for Conservation of Nature and European Commission.
