= Trichrysis cyanea =

- Trichrysis cyanea in Italy

Scientific classification
- Kingdom: Animalia
- Phylum: Arthropoda
- Clade: Pancrustacea
- Class: Insecta
- Order: Hymenoptera
- Family: Chrysididae
- Genus: Trichrysis
- Species: T. cyanea

Binomial name
- Trichrysis cyanea (Linnaeus, 1758)

Synonyms
- Sphex cyanea Linnaeus, 1758

Species of wasp

Trichrysis cyanea is a species of cuckoo wasps, insects in the family Chrysididae.

== Distribution ==
This species is widespread in most of Europe and northern Africa throughout the Palearctic realm (central Asia, Siberia, Korea, China, and Japan).

== Habitat ==
These wasps inhabit forest margins, clearings and areas with sun-exposed dead trees and tree stumps, usually nesting sites of its hosts.

== Description ==
Trichrysis cyanea can reach a body length of about 4–8 mm (0.16–0.31 in). These small sized cuckoo wasps have an elongated and completely blue-green or violet colored body, but males are often completely or partly black. The posterior margin of the third tergite of the abdomen shows three small wide teeth. The first tergite has a smooth middle furrow.

This species is very similar to the species of the genus Chrysis.

== Biology ==
The adults can be found in several generations from May to October, but mainly during June and July. These wasps parasitizes mainly on wasps of the group Trypoxylon figulus and Trypoxylon attenuatum (Crabronidae), but also Auplopus carbonarius and species of Dipogon (Pompilidae). Other recorded hosts are Hylaeus pectoralis, Heriades truncorum, Pemphredon lethifer, Stigmus pendulus, Ancistrocerus, Odynerus parietum, Cemonus unicolor, Nitela spinolae, Ectemnius rubicolus, Pison atrum, Psenulus pallipes, Osmia aenea, Osmia giraudi and Chelostoma florisomne.

The female lays her egg at different times of nest building. The larvae are well recognizable by its gray-green body and brightly colored head and abdomen. Over the next five days, the larvae feed on the food supply. The pupation takes place in a shining golden brown cocoon. The development of the imago lasts 17 to 23 days. Larvae usually overwinter.
