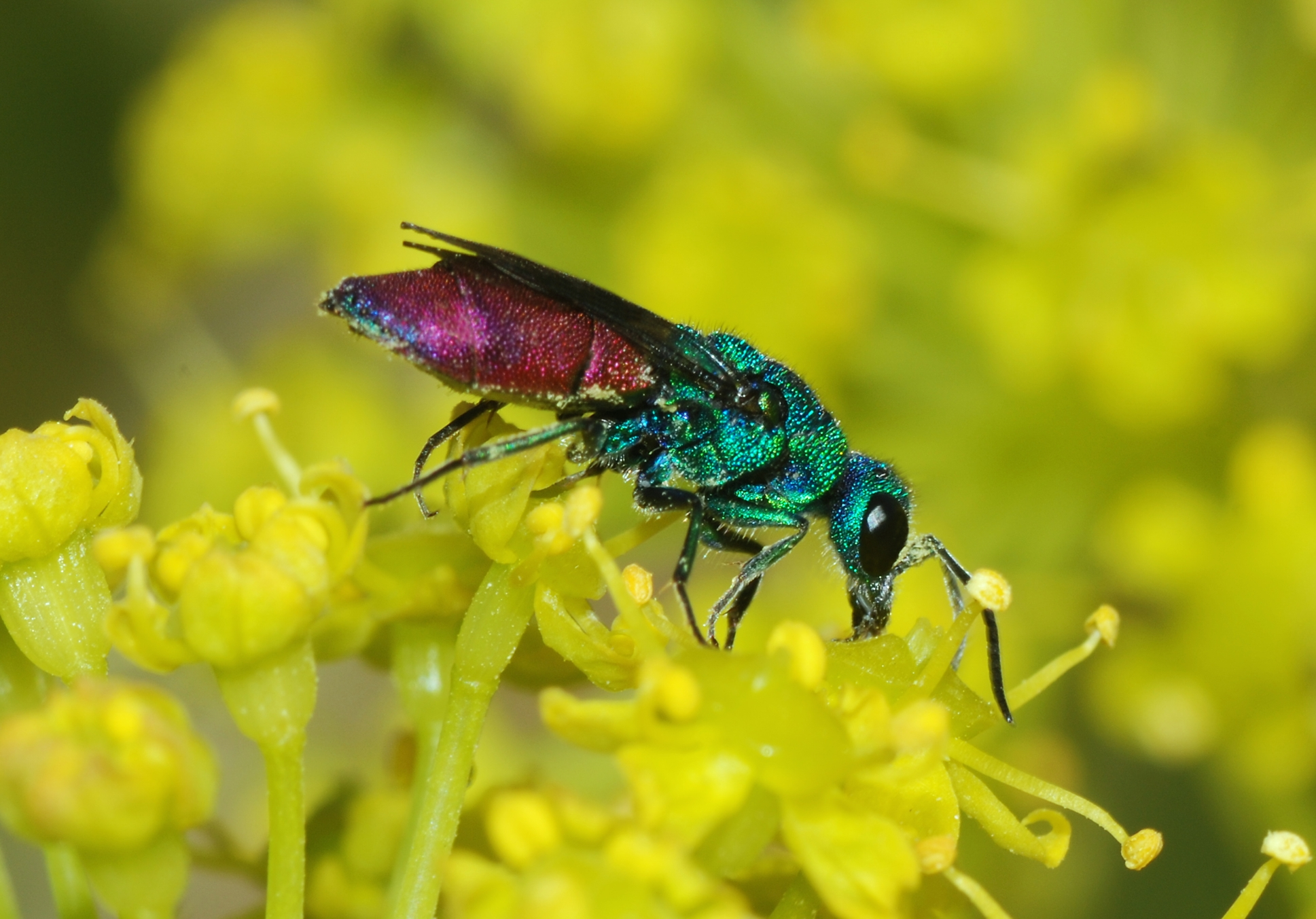
- Chrysura refulgens

Scientific classification
- Kingdom: Animalia
- Phylum: Arthropoda
- Class: Insecta
- Order: Hymenoptera
- Family: Chrysididae
- Tribe: Chrysidini
- Genus: Chrysura; Dahlbom, 1845

Type species
- Chrysura austriaca (Fabricius, 1804)

Synonyms
- Monochrysis Lichtenstein, 1876; Olochrysis Lichtenstein, 1876; Holochrysis Rye, 1878 Emend.; Chrysoura Dalla Torre, 1892 Emend.; Arctochrysis Haupt, 1956; Taeniochrysis Haupt, 1956; Selenochrysis Haupt, 1956; Ischnochrysis Haupt, 1956; Conochrysis Haupt, 1956

= Chrysura =

Genus of wasps

Chrysura is a genus of cuckoo wasps which parasitize megachilid bees. There are 117 species in Chrysura, all but 11 of which are found in the Palaearctic, making it the third largest genus in the family. The genus was described by Dahlbom in 1845, and the type species for the genus is Chrysura austriaca.

== Selected species ==
Species within this genus include:

- Chrysura arcadiae (Arens, 2001)
- Chrysura auropicta (Mocsáry, 1889)
- Chrysura austriaca (Fabricius, 1804)
- Chrysura baccha (Balthasar, 1953)
- Chrysura candens (Germar, 1817)
- Chrysura ciliciensis (Mocsáry, 1914)
- Chrysura circe (Mocsáry, 1889)
- Chrysura cuprea (Rossi, 1790)
- Chrysura declinanalis (Linsenmaier, 1968)
- Chrysura dichroa (Dahlbom, 1854)
- Chrysura dichropsis (R. du Buysson, 1894)
- Chrysura erigone (Mocsáry, 1889)
- Chrysura fernandezi (Linsenmaier, 1993)
- Chrysura filiformis (Mocsáry, 1889)
- Chrysura foveatidorsa (Linsenmaier, 1968)
- Chrysura graja (Mocsáry, 1889)
- Chrysura hirsuta (Gerstaecker, 1869)
- Chrysura hybrida (Lepeletier, 1806)
- Chrysura ignifrons (Brullé, 1832)
- Chrysura isabella (Trautmann, 1926)
- Chrysura judith (Balthasar, 1953)
- Chrysura krueperi (Mocsáry, 1889)
- Chrysura laconiae (Arens, 2001)
- Chrysura laevigata (Abeille de Perrin, 1879)
- Chrysura laodamia (R. du Buysson, 1900)
- Chrysura lydiae (Mocsáry, 1889)
- Chrysura magrettii (Du Buysson, 1890)
- Chrysura mistrasensis (Linsenmaier, 1968)
- Chrysura moreae (Arens, 2001)
- Chrysura oraniensis (Lucas, 1849)
- Chrysura pelopaeicida (R. du Buysson, 1887)
- Chrysura pseudodichroa (Linsenmaier, 1959)
- Chrysura purpureifrons (Abeille de Perrin, 1878)
- Chrysura pyrogaster (Brullé, 1832)
- Chrysura radians (Harris, 1776)
- Chrysura refulgens (Spinola, 1806)
- Chrysura rufiventris (Dahlbom, 1854)
- Chrysura simplex (Dahlbom, 1854)
- Chrysura simulacra (Linsenmaier, 1959)
- Chrysura simuldichroa (Linsenmaier, 1969)
- Chrysura smyrnensis (Mocsáry, 1889)
- Chrysura sulcata (Dahlbom, 1845)
- Chrysura trimaculata (Förster, 1853)
- Chrysura varicornis (Spinola, 1838)
