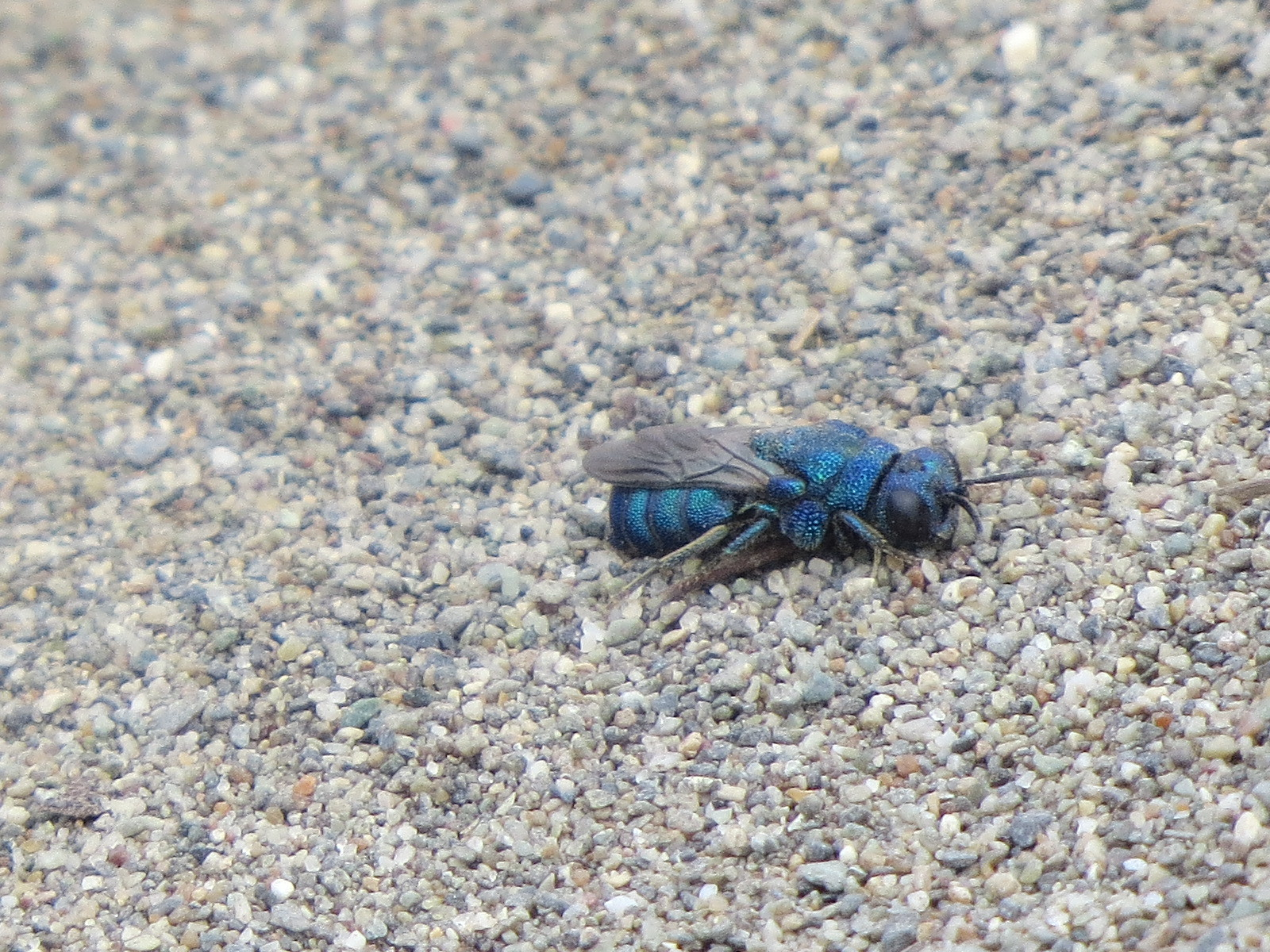

Scientific classification
- Kingdom: Animalia
- Phylum: Arthropoda
- Class: Insecta
- Order: Hymenoptera
- Family: Chrysididae
- Genus: Parnopes
- Species: P. edwardsii

Binomial name
- Parnopes edwardsii Cresson, 1879

= Parnopes edwardsii =

Species of cuckoo wasp

Parnopes edwardsii is a species of parasitic cuckoo wasp. Native to North America west of the Rocky Mountains, the metallic blue-green wasps are nest parasites of sand wasps.
