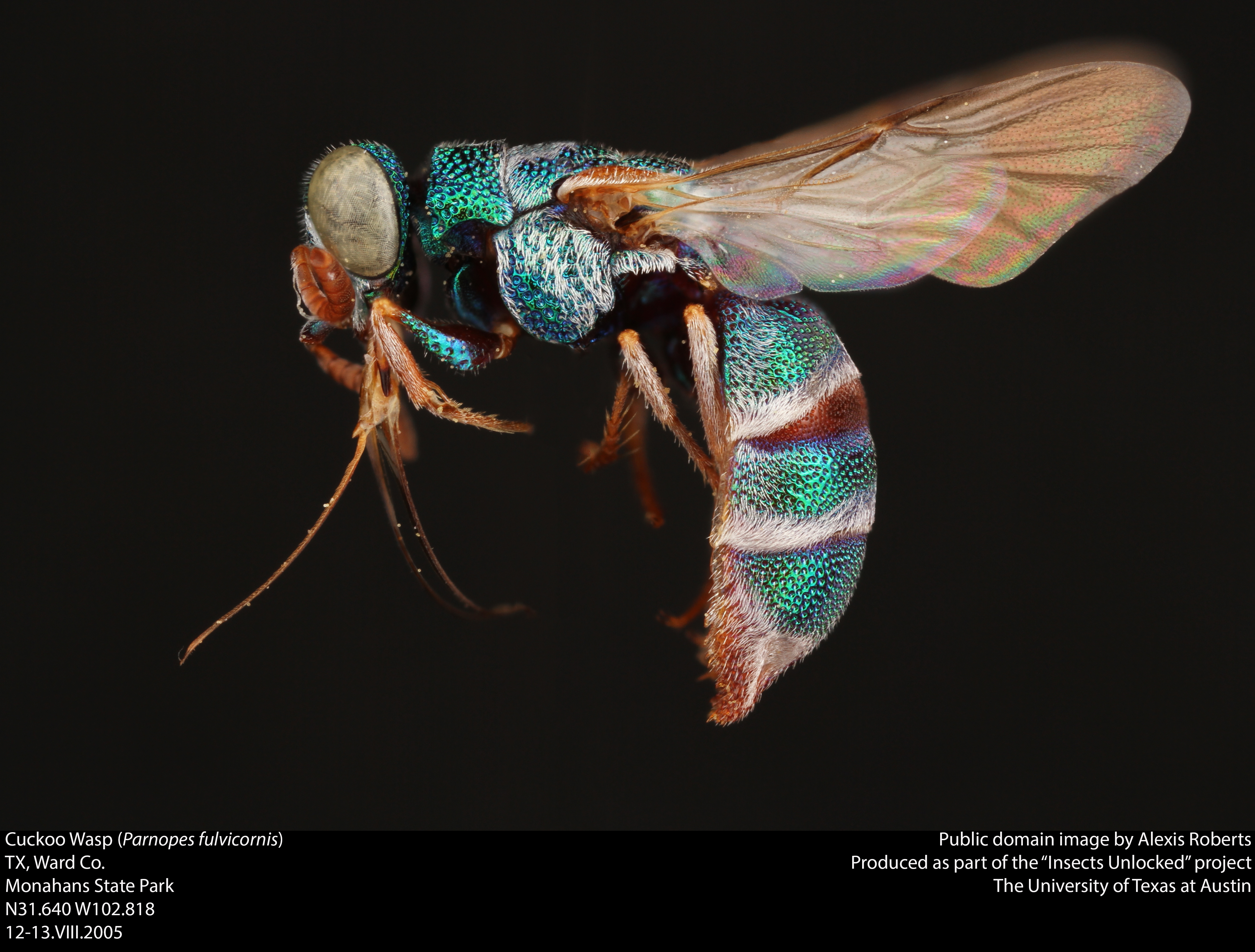
- Parnopes fulvicornis

Scientific classification
- Kingdom: Animalia
- Phylum: Arthropoda
- Class: Insecta
- Order: Hymenoptera
- Family: Chrysididae
- Subfamily: Chrysidinae
- Tribe: Parnopini

= Parnopini =

Tribe of wasps

Parnopini is a small tribe of cuckoo wasps in the family Chrysididae. There are 3 genera and about 20 described species in Parnopini; only the hosts of one genus (Parnopes) are known, and they are in the Crabronidae.

== Genera ==
- Cephaloparnops Bischoff, 1910
- Isadelphia Semenov, 1902
- Parnopes Latreille, 1796
