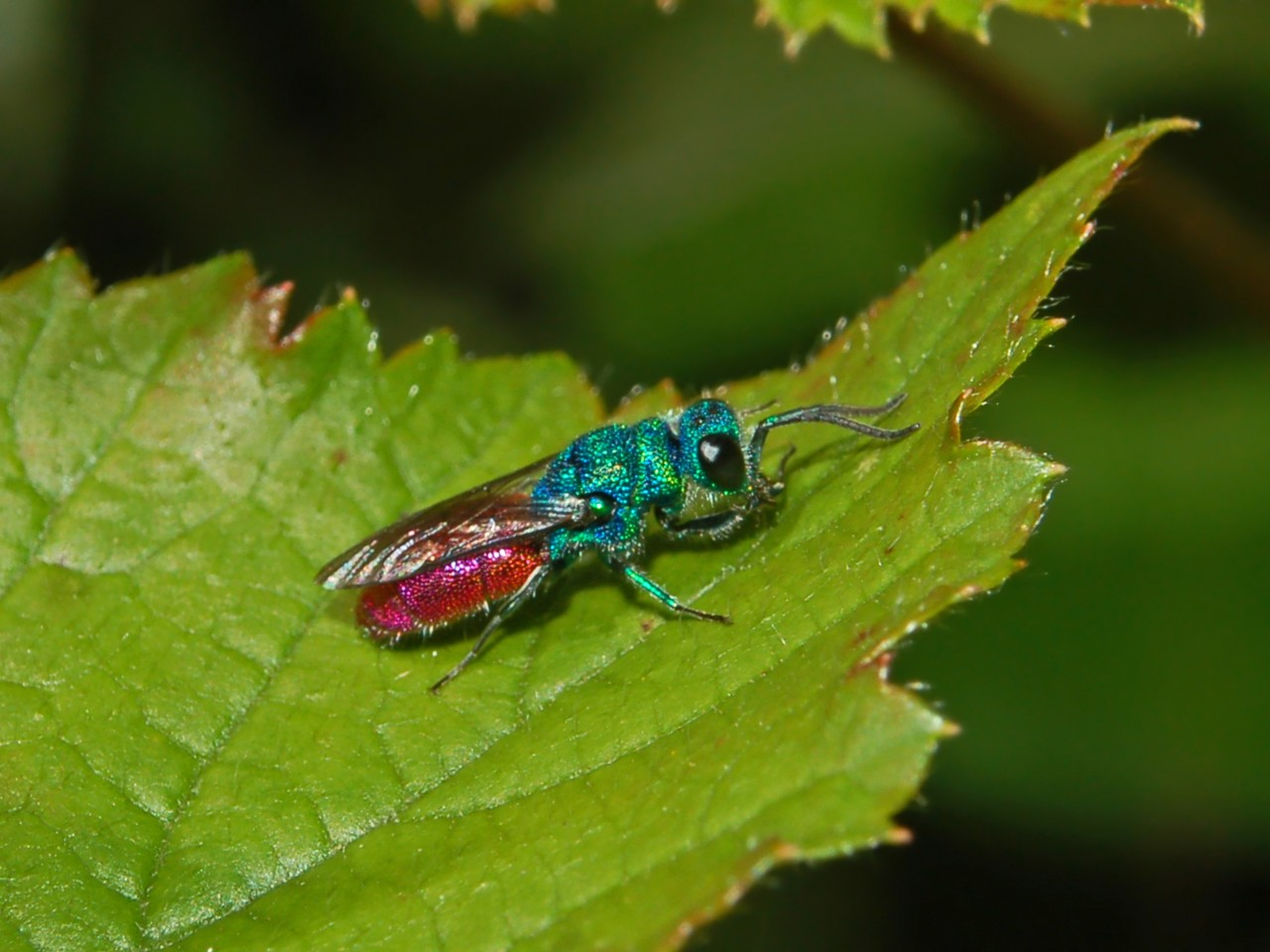
- Chrysis inaequalis

Scientific classification
- Kingdom: Animalia
- Phylum: Arthropoda
- Class: Insecta
- Order: Hymenoptera
- Family: Chrysididae
- Subfamily: Chrysidinae
- Tribe: Chrysidini

= Chrysidini =

Tribe of wasps

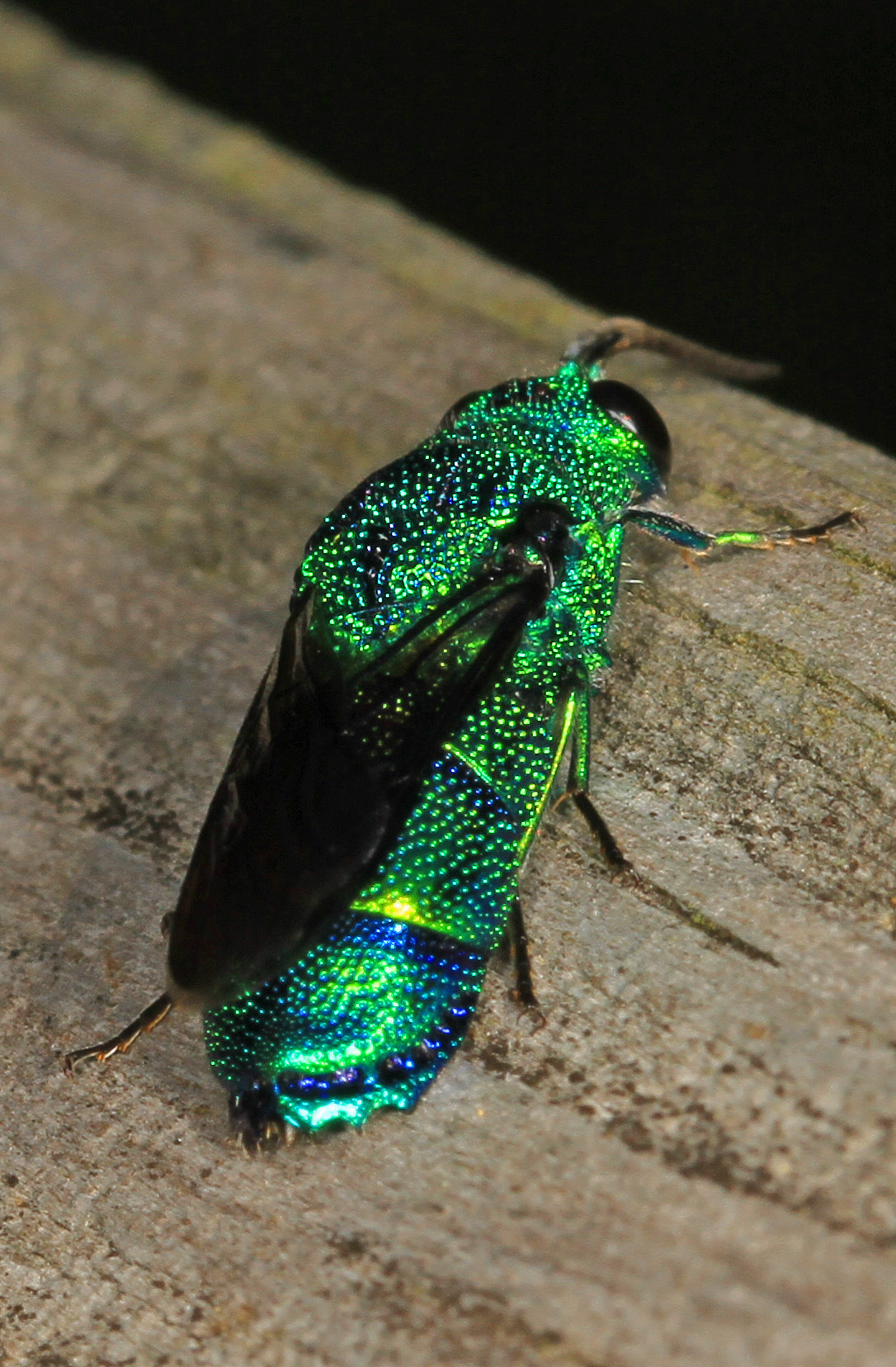
Chrysis smaragdula

Chrysidini is a very large tribe of cuckoo wasps in the subfamily Chrysidinae; this tribe contains more than half of all chrysidid species.

== Genera ==
These genera belong to the tribe Chrysidini:

- Allochrysis Semenov
- Argochrysis Kimsey & Bohart, 1981^{g b}
- Caenochrysis Kimsey & Bohart, 1981^{g b}
- Ceratochrysis Cooper, 1952^{g b}
- Chrysidea Bischoff, 1913^{g w}
- Chrysis Linnaeus, 1761^{i c g b w}
- Chrysura Dahlbom, 1845^{g b w}
- Chrysurissa Bohart, 1980^{b}
- Euchroeus Latreille, 1809 (= Brugmoia)
- Exochrysis Bohart, 1966^{g b}
- Gaullea Buysson
- Ipsiura Linsenmaier, 1959
- Neochrysis Linsenmaier, 1959
- Odontochrydium Brauns, 1928^{w}
- Pentachrysis Lichtenstein, 1876^{g}
- Pleurochrysis Bohart, 1966
- Praestochrysis Linsenmaier, 1959^{g w}
- Primeuchroeus Linsenmaier, 1968^{g w}
- Pseudospinolia Linsenmaier, 1951^{g w}
- Spinolia Dahlbom, 1854^{g}
- Spintharina Semenov, 1892^{g w}
- Spintharosoma Zimmerman, 1959^{w}
- Stilbichrysis Bischoff, 1910^{w}
- Stilbum Spinola, 1806^{g w}
- Trichrysis Lichtenstein, 1876^{g w}

Data sources: i = ITIS, c = Catalogue of Life, g = GBIF, b = Bugguide.net, w = WaspWeb
