= Chrysura austriaca =

Scientific classification
- Kingdom: Animalia
- Phylum: Arthropoda
- Class: Insecta
- Order: Hymenoptera
- Family: Chrysididae
- Genus: Chrysura
- Species: C. austriaca

Binomial name
- Chrysura austriaca (Fabricius, 1804)

Species of parasitic wasp

Chrysura austriaca, also known as the Austrian cuckoo wasp, is a species of parasitic wasp within the family Chrysididae.

== Description ==
Chrysura austriaca can range in length from 8-12 mm long. The mesosoma and head are blue, sometimes with lateral golden green reflections on the mesoscutum. The metasoma however is golden red in colour. The mandible of the organism possesses a tiny subapical tooth. The antennal segments of males are not ventrally swollen. C. austriaca has a ventrally broader head than other similar coloured Chrysura species. The flight period of the species is from June to early August.

== Distribution and habitat ==
Chrysura austriaca has a Trans-Paleartic distribution reaching from Europe and North Africa to Siberia and Japan. In Europe the species has been recorded in Germany, Spain, Italy and Lithuania.

Chrysura austriaca is a parasite therefore populations can only survive close to their host species. C. austriaca can be found living in forest margin and garden habitats near to sites where their host species lay their eggs such as: wooden fencing, brick and drystone walls, loess, rocks and clay deposits.

=== Host species ===
The following species are known to be hosts for Chrysura austriaca.

- Osmia parietina
- Hoplitis adunca
