= Pleurochrysis (wasp) =

Scientific classification
- Kingdom: Animalia
- Phylum: Arthropoda
- Class: Insecta
- Order: Hymenoptera
- Family: Chrysididae
- Tribe: Chrysidini
- Genus: Pleurochrysis; Bohart, 1966

Genus of wasps

Pleurochrysis is a genus of cuckoo wasps from the New World, with 36 species distributed from Mexico to Argentina. One species is a parasitoid of the potter wasp Cyphomenes anisitsii.
