= Cyphomenes infernalis =

Scientific classification
- Kingdom: Animalia
- Phylum: Arthropoda
- Clade: Pancrustacea
- Class: Insecta
- Order: Hymenoptera
- Family: Vespidae
- Genus: Cyphomenes
- Species: C. infernalis

Binomial name
- Cyphomenes infernalis (de Saussure, 1875)

Species of potter wasp

Cyphomenes infernalis is a species of potter wasp, family Eumenidae. It is Neotropical (including Peru). It was described by Henri Louis Frédéric de Saussure in 1875. As of 2025 there is one subspecies listed in the Catalogue of Life, Cyphomenes infernalis weyrauchi.
