= Cyphomenes =

Scientific classification
- Domain: Eukaryota
- Kingdom: Animalia
- Phylum: Arthropoda
- Class: Insecta
- Order: Hymenoptera
- Family: Vespidae
- Subfamily: Eumeninae
- Genus: Cyphomenes; Giordani Soika, 1978

Species
- Cyphomenes anisitsii (Brethes, 1906); Cyphomenes infernalis (de Saussure), 1875; Cyphomenes schremmeri Giordani Soika, 1978

Genus of wasps

Cyphomenes is a small neotropical genus of potter wasps currently containing 3 species.
