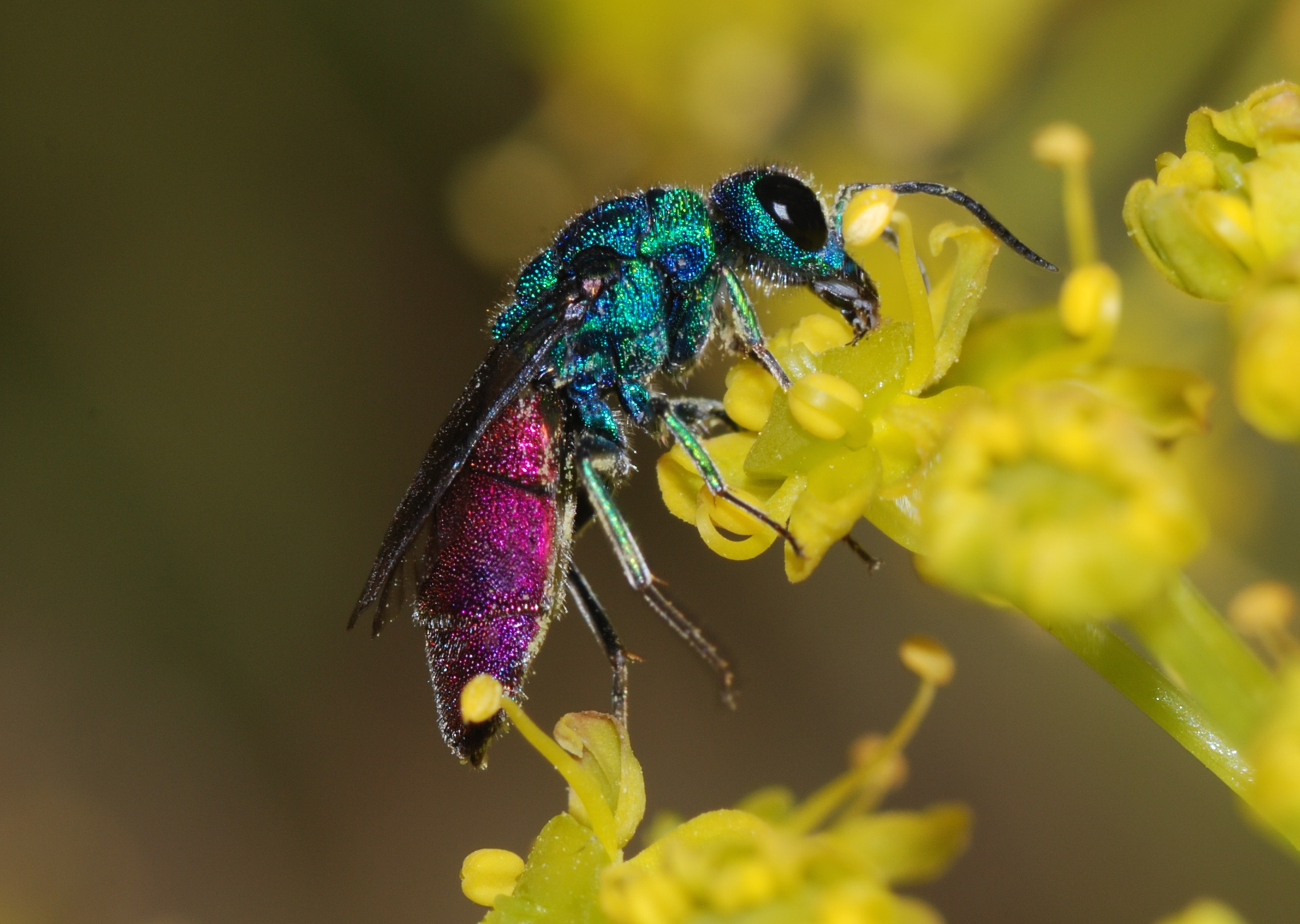
- Chrysura refulgens
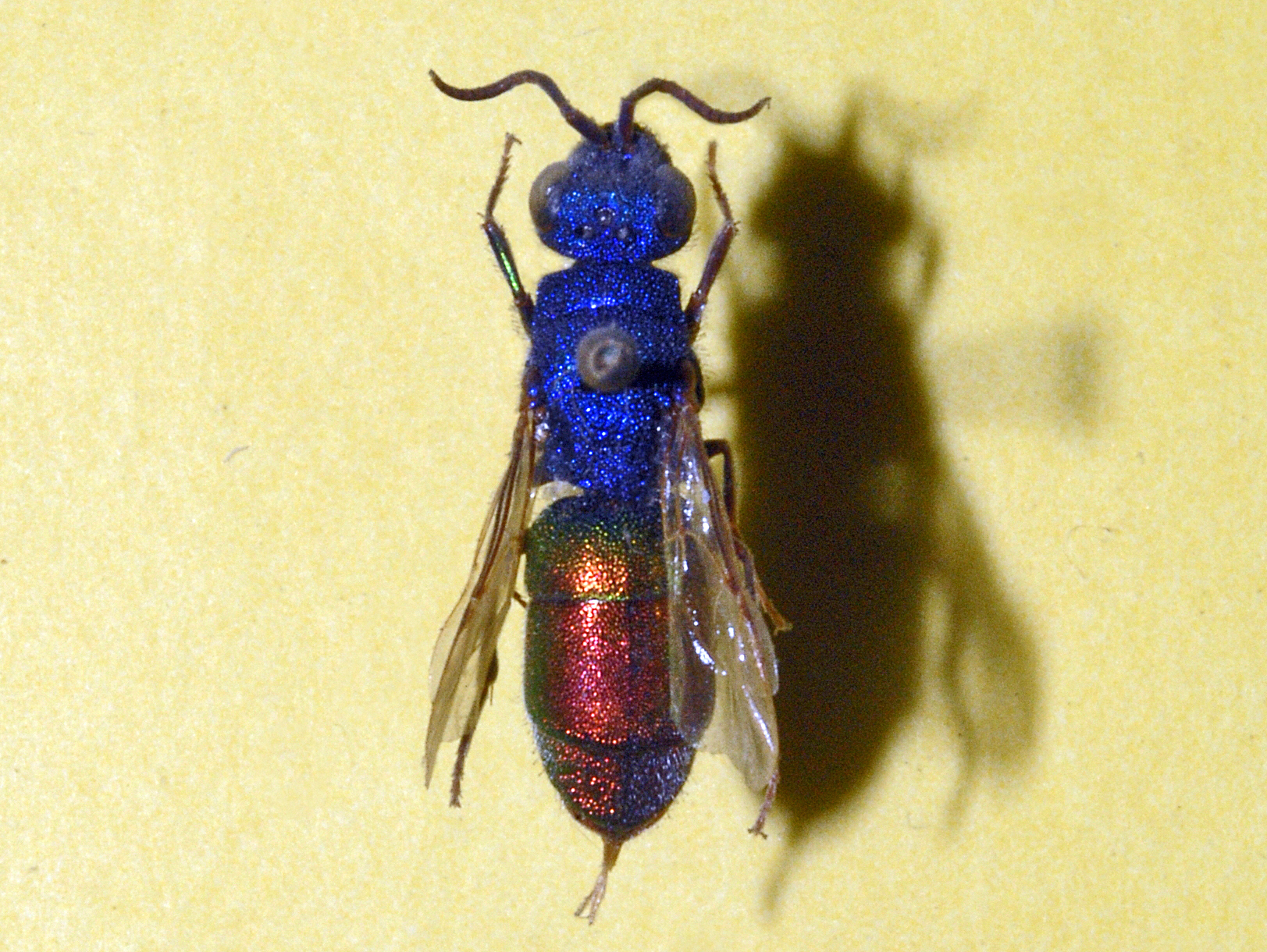
- Chrysura refulgens. Museum specimen

Scientific classification
- Kingdom: Animalia
- Phylum: Arthropoda
- Class: Insecta
- Order: Hymenoptera
- Family: Chrysididae
- Genus: Chrysura
- Species: C. refulgens

Binomial name
- Chrysura refulgens (Spinola, 1806)

= Chrysura refulgens =

Species of wasp

Chrysura refulgens is a species of cuckoo wasps (insects in the family Chrysididae).

== Description ==
Chrysura refulgens can reach a length of 10–12 millimetres (0.39–0.47 in). It is one of the largest South European Chrysura. Head and chest are metallic bluish, while the abdomen is metallic golden-red.

== Biology ==
Chrysura refulgens fly from May to July. The larvae live as parasites of Osmia bicolor, Chalicodoma species and Anthidium species.

== Distribution ==
These wasps can be found in most of Europe, in the North East and in North Africa.
