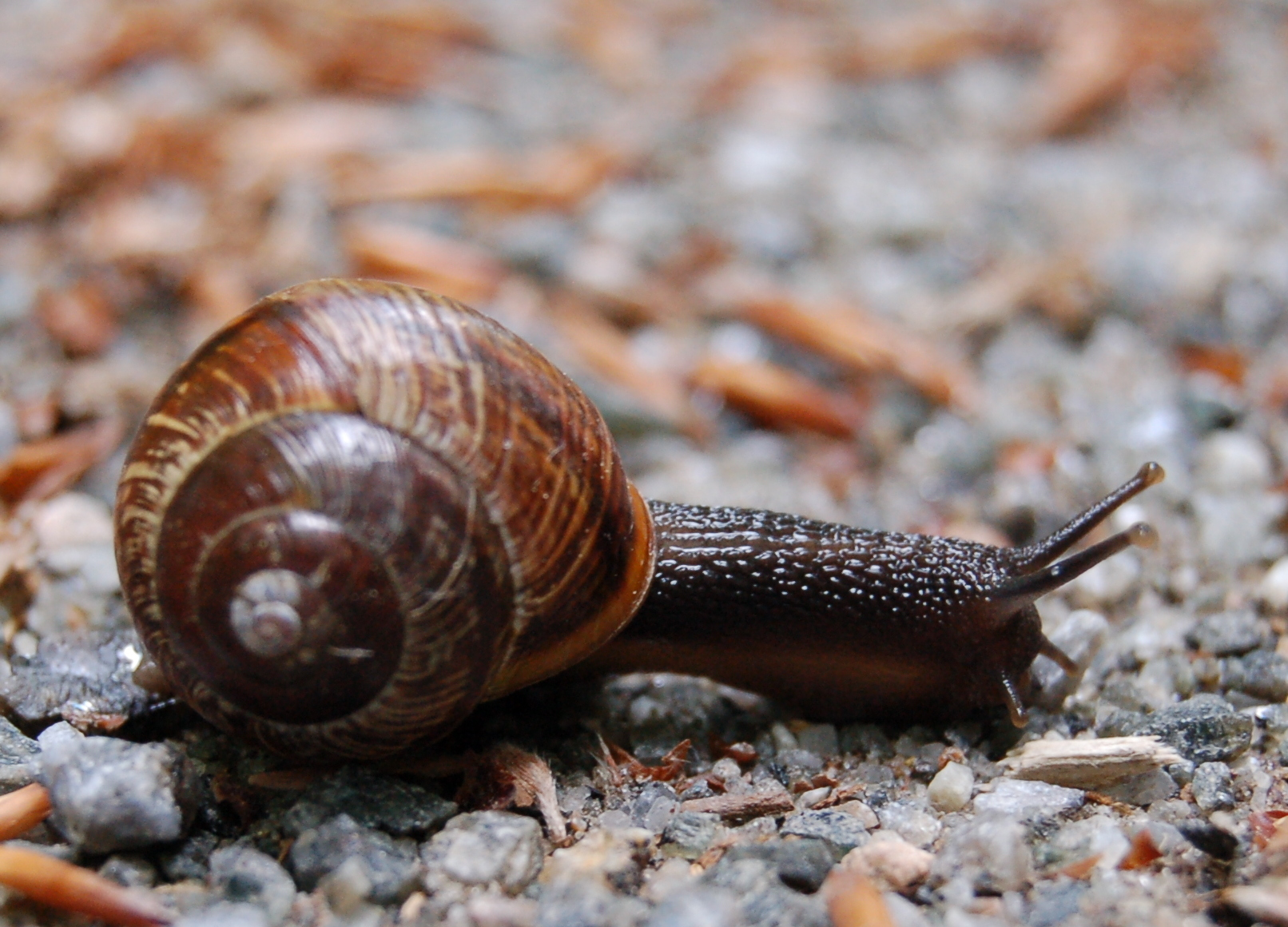
- Live Arianta arbustorum
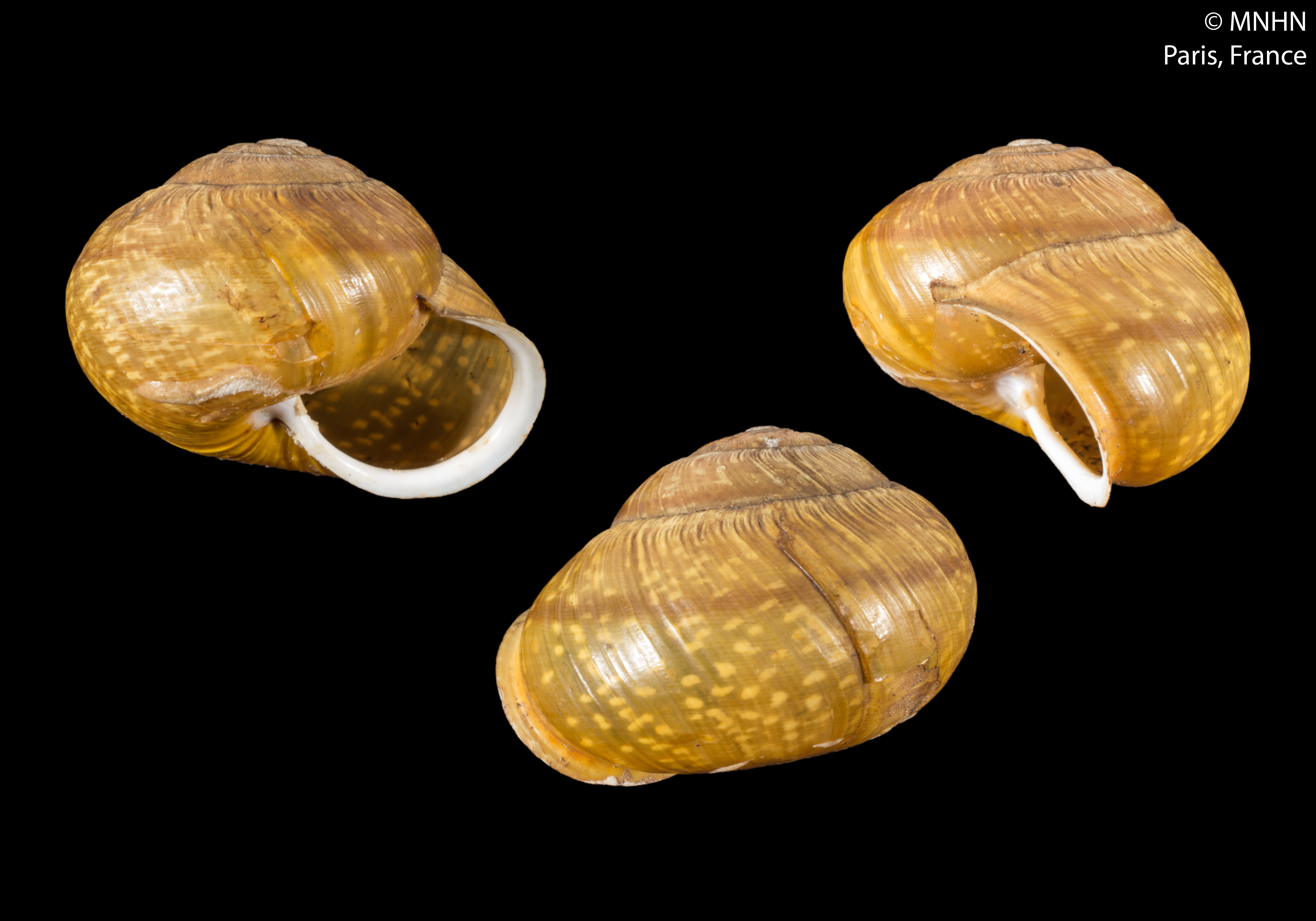
- Shell of Arianta arbustorum (syntype at MNHN, Paris)

Conservation status
- Least Concern (IUCN 3.1)

- Secure (NatureServe)

Scientific classification
- Kingdom: Animalia
- Phylum: Mollusca
- Class: Gastropoda
- Order: Stylommatophora
- Family: Helicidae
- Genus: Arianta
- Species: A. arbustorum

Binomial name
- Arianta arbustorum (Linnaeus, 1758)
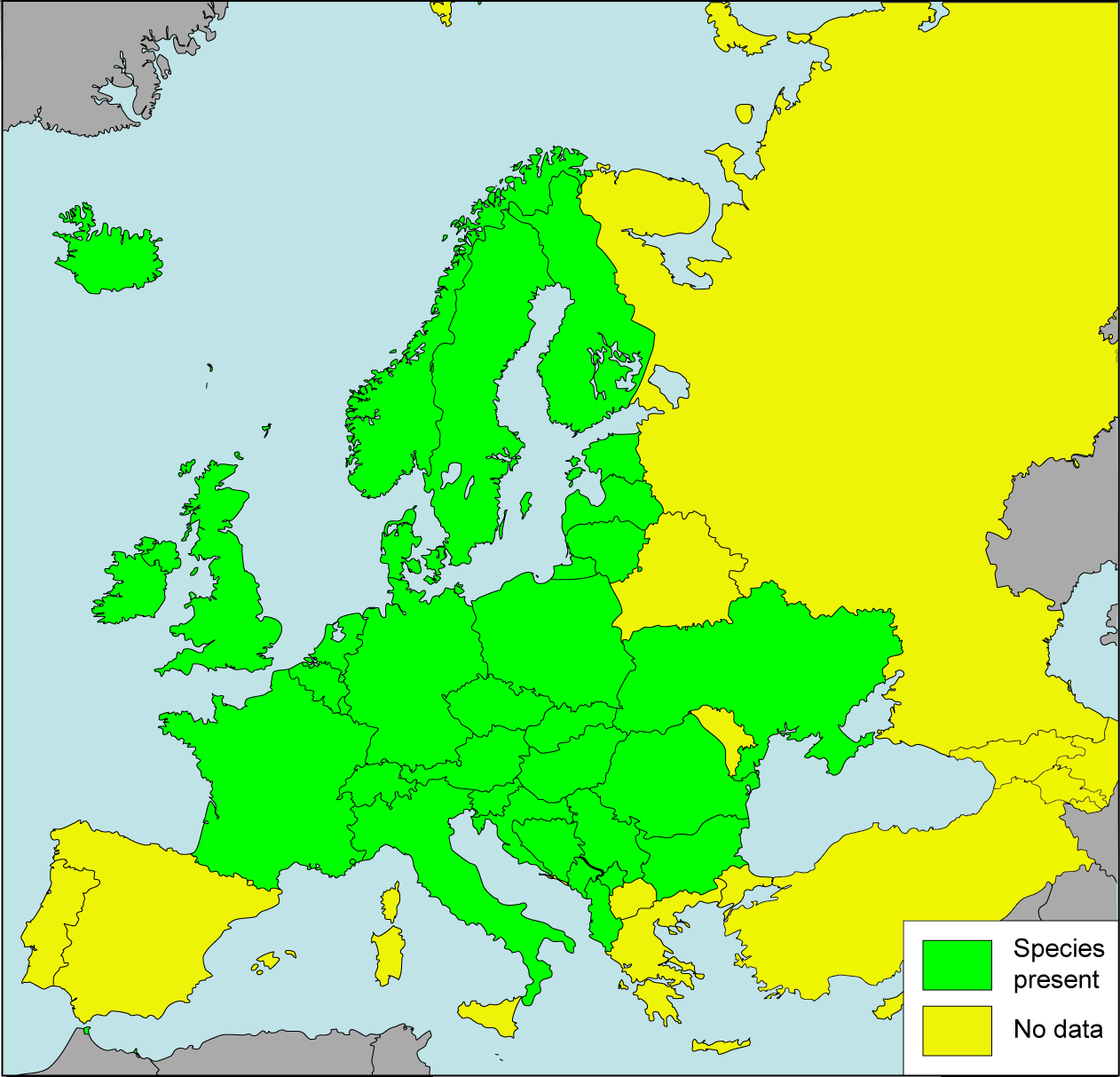

Synonyms
- Helix arbustorum Linnaeus, 1758; Helix rufescens Pennant, 1777; Helix thamnivaga Mabille, 1883

= Arianta arbustorum =

Species of gastropod

Arianta arbustorum, sometimes known as the copse snail, is a medium-sized species of pulmonate land snail in the family Helicidae.

== Subspecies ==
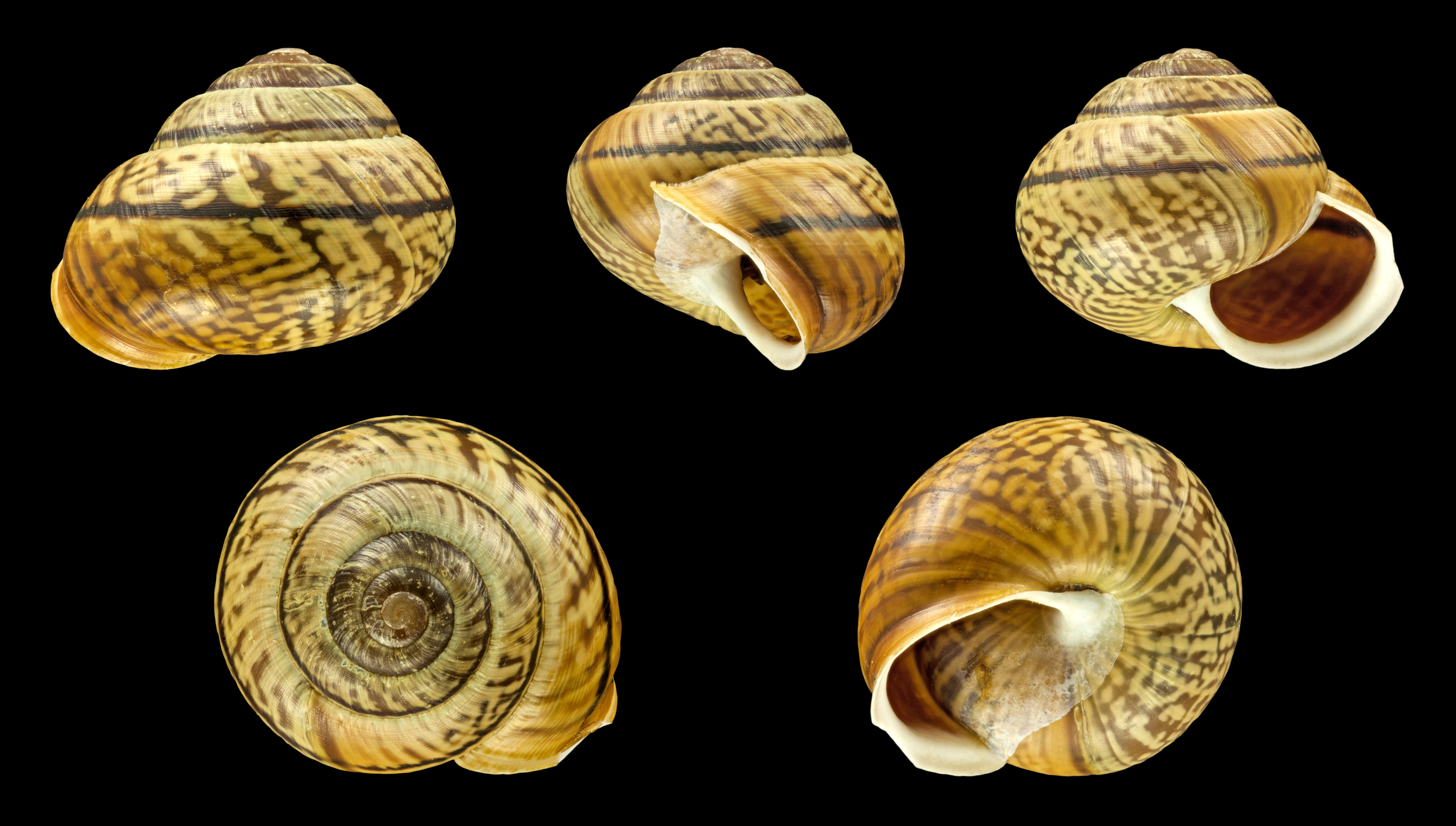
Arianta arbustorum alpicola

Several subspecies are recognized by some authors:

- Arianta arbustorum alpicola Férussac, 1821
- Arianta arbustorum arbustorum (Linnaeus, 1758)
- Arianta arbustorum canigonensis (Boubée, 1833)
- Arianta arbustorum picea
- Arianta arbustorum pseudorudis (Schlesch, 1924)
- Arianta arbustorum repellini (Reeve, 1852)
- Arianta arbustorum styriaca (Frauenfeld, 1868)
- Arianta arbustorum vareliensis Ripken & Falkner, 2000

== Distribution ==
This species is native to Europe:

- Northwestern and central Europe, including the Alps and the Carpathians.
- Netherlands
- Austria
- Czech Republic
- Slovakia
- Poland
- Switzerland, where it is one of the most frequent species of land snails. It can be very abundant, reaching up to 20 adults per square meter.
- Eastern Pyrenees, Spain
- Norway
- Iceland
- Faroe Islands
- The British Isles: Great Britain and Ireland In Britain, the species suffered slightly from intensive farming and the continuous destruction of suitable uncultivated refuge space. It is rare in Ireland.
- Kaliningrad
- Finland. In Finland, it has become so common in the Porvoo region east of Helsinki, that it is locally called the "Porvoo snail".
- Estonia
- Latvia
- Scattered across Serbia
- It is rare in Bulgaria.
- Western Ukraine

Arianta arbustorum has been introduced to North America but is only known in Canada, where established populations are found in Newfoundland, New Brunswick, Ontario, and Prince Edward Island.

This species has not yet become established in the US, but it is considered to represent a potentially serious threat as an invasive species that could negatively affect agriculture, natural ecosystems, human health or commerce. Therefore, it has been suggested that this species be given top national quarantine significance in the USA.

== Description ==
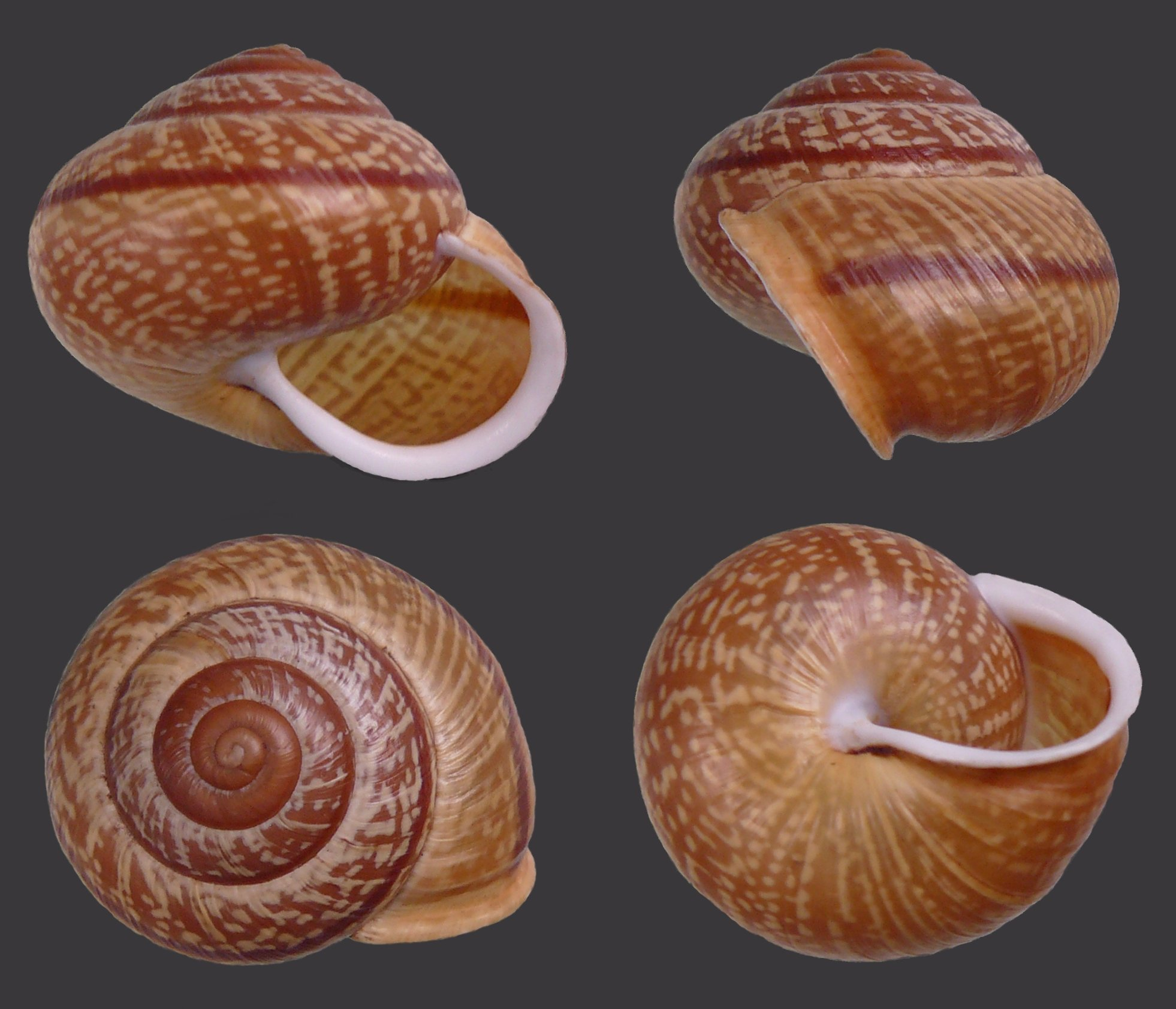
apertural view of the shell of Arianta arbustorum (top left); lateral view (top right); apical view (bottom left) and umbilical view (bottom right)

The shell is usually brown with numerous rows of pale yellowish spots and with a brown band above the periphery, occasionally yellowish, reddish or greenish in hue, weakly striated and with fine spiral lines on the upper side. The shell has 5–5.5 convex whorls with a deep suture. The last whorl slightly descends near the aperture. The aperture has a prominent white lip inside. The apertural margin is reflected. Umbilicus is entirely covered by the reflected columellar margin.

The width of the shell is 18–25 mm. The height of the shell is 12–22 mm. Dimensions are locally variable.

The shell shape is globular in most present-day populations, but it is believed to have been depressed during the Pleistocene. Before lowlands were colonized and the shells became globular, the species re-invaded mountain regions, except for a few isolated spots among glaciers.

The animal is usually black in color.

== Life cycle ==
Arianta arbustorum lives in forests and open habitats of any kind. It requires humidity. It also lives in disturbed habitats (except in Ireland, where it is restricted to old native woodland). It may locally tolerate non-calcareous substrate, in north Scotland also on sandhills. It is found at elevations up to 2,700 m in the Alps, 1,200 m in Britain, and 1,500 m in Bulgaria.

It feeds on green herbs, dead animals and faeces.

If snails hatch more than 50 m apart, they are considered isolated, as they rarely move more than 25 m (neighbourhood area 32–50 m); usually, they move about 7–12 m in a year, mostly along water currents.

drawing of love dart of Arianta arbustorum

This species of snail makes and uses calcareous love darts during mating. Reproduction is usually after copulation, but self-fertilization is also possible. The size of the egg is 3.2 mm. Maturity is reached after 2–4 years. The maximum age is up to 14 years.

Angiostrongylus vasorum has been used to experimentally infect this snail.

== Prevention ==
Metaldehyde and iron phosphate can be used to exterminate snails. Since copper generates electric shocks that make it difficult for snails to move, it can serve as a barrier.
