= Cyphomenes schremmeri =

Scientific classification
- Kingdom: Animalia
- Phylum: Arthropoda
- Clade: Pancrustacea
- Class: Insecta
- Order: Hymenoptera
- Family: Vespidae
- Genus: Cyphomenes
- Species: C. schremmeri

Binomial name
- Cyphomenes schremmeri Giordani Soika, 1978

Species of South American potter wasp

Cyphomenes schremmeri is a species of insect in the genus Cyphomenes and the family Eumenidae described by Antonio Giordani Soika in 1978. C. schremmeri is native to Venezuela and Colombia. As of 2017, no subspecies are listed in the Catalogue of Life.
