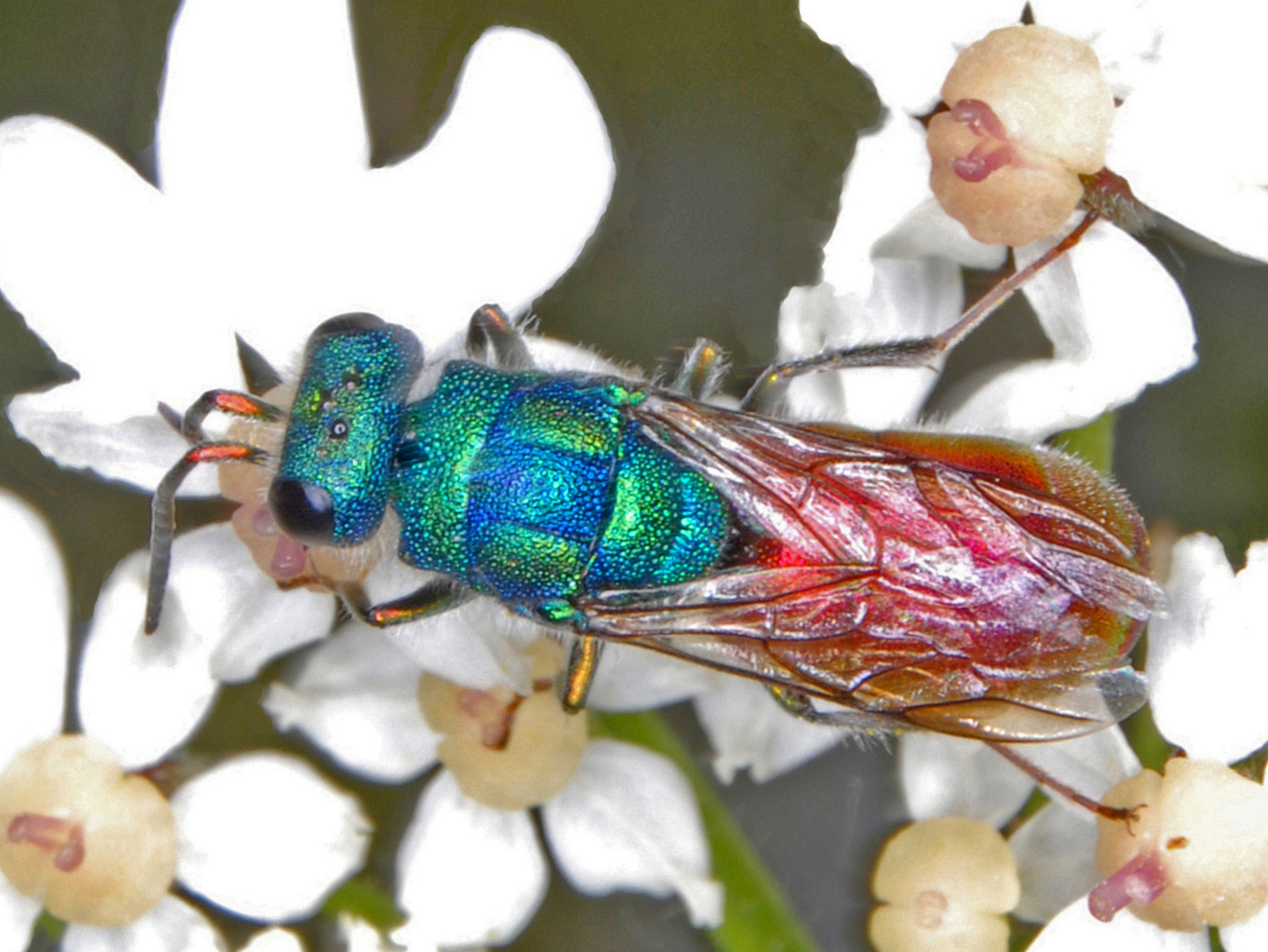
- Chrysura simplex ampliata. Dorsal view
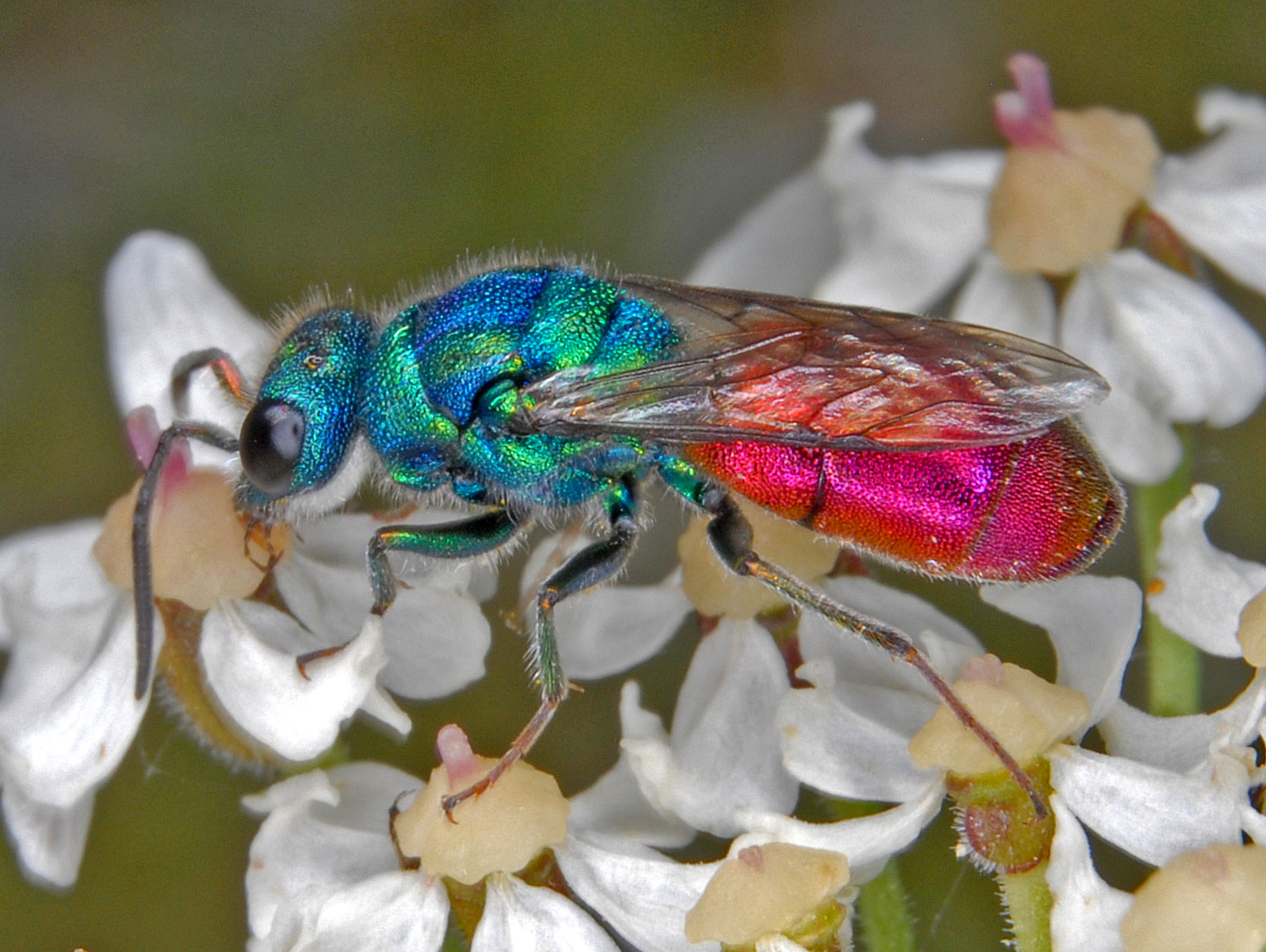
- Side view

Scientific classification
- Kingdom: Animalia
- Phylum: Arthropoda
- Clade: Pancrustacea
- Class: Insecta
- Order: Hymenoptera
- Family: Chrysididae
- Genus: Chrysura
- Species: C. simplex

Binomial name
- Chrysura simplex (Dahlbom, 1854)

Synonyms
- Chrysis simplex Dahlbom, 1854

= Chrysura simplex =

Species of wasp

Chrysura simplex is a species of cuckoo wasps, insects in the family Chrysididae.

== Subspecies ==
Subspecies include:

- Chrysura simplex simplex (Dahlbom, 1854)
- Chrysura simplex ampliata (Linsenmaier, 1968)

== Distribution ==
This species is present in part of Europe (Albania, Austria, France, Italy, Greece, Czech Republic, Hungary, Poland, Slovakia, Spain, Switzerland and Ukraine) and in North Africa (Algeria, Libya, Morocco, Tunisia).

== Habitat ==
These cuckoo wasps mainly inhabit grassy cliffs and sunny slopes. They can be found on plants of Euphorbia, Sedum, Daucus carota and Crepis hieracioides.

== Description ==
Chrysura simplex can reach a length of about 7–9.5 millimetres (0.28–0.37 in). These wasps have a stout body with a gray pubescence. The head is metallic blue-green, nearly square, rather big, closely punctulate, with a flat face and short antennae. Also the thorax is densely dotted, with blach hairs and a basically shining blue-green coloration. Mesonotum is shining blue. The abdomen is robust. almost oval, densely punctate and silky-shiny, with red to purple-red coloration, without black patches. The wings are pale brown and hyaline. In males the red colouration is more intense.

== Biology ==
Chrysura simplex is a univoltine species. Adults fly from mid-June until mid-July. They especially feed on flowers of Euphorbiaceae and Apiaceae. The larvae live as parasites of Megachile parietina, Hoplitis anthocopoides and Osmia cornuta.

== Bibliography ==
- Goulet H. & Huber J.T. (eds), 1993. Hymenoptera of the world: an identification guide to families.
- Kimsey L.S. & Bohart R.M., 1990 (1991) - The chrysidid wasps of the world.
- Rosa P., 2006 - I Crisidi della Valle d'Aosta.
