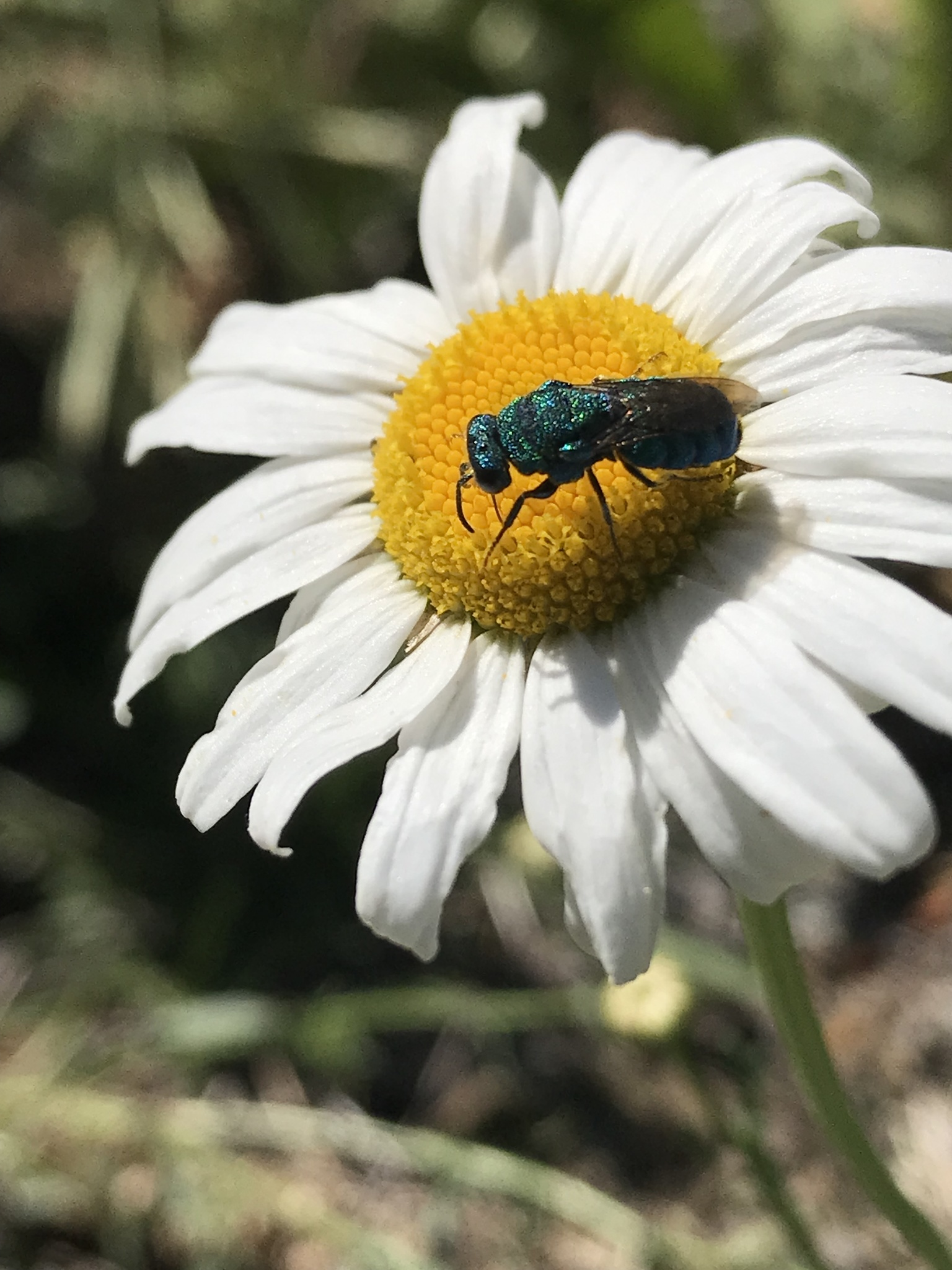
- Plumas National Forest, 2021

Scientific classification
- Kingdom: Animalia
- Phylum: Arthropoda
- Class: Insecta
- Order: Hymenoptera
- Family: Chrysididae
- Tribe: Parnopini
- Genus: Parnopes; Latreille, 1796

= Parnopes =

Genus of wasps

Parnopes is a genus of cuckoo wasps in the family Chrysididae. The known hosts are in the family Bembicidae (formerly a subfamily of Crabronidae).

== Species ==
- Parnopes bajaensis Kimsey, 1987
- Parnopes borregoensis Telford, 1964
- Parnopes chrysoprasinus Smith, 1874
- Parnopes concinnus Viereck, 1904
- Parnopes desertorum Kimsey, 1987
- Parnopes edwardsii (Cresson, 1879)
- Parnopes festivus (Fabricius, 1793)
- Parnopes fisheri Spinola, 1838
- Parnopes fulvicornis Cameron, 1888
- Parnopes glasunowi Semenov, 1901
- Parnopes grandior (Pallas, 1771)
- Parnopes indicus Linsenmaier, 1968
- Parnopes madecassus Saussure, 1887
- Parnopes popovii Eversmann, 1857
- Parnopes unicolor Gribodo, 1879
- Parnopes viridis Brullé, 1846
