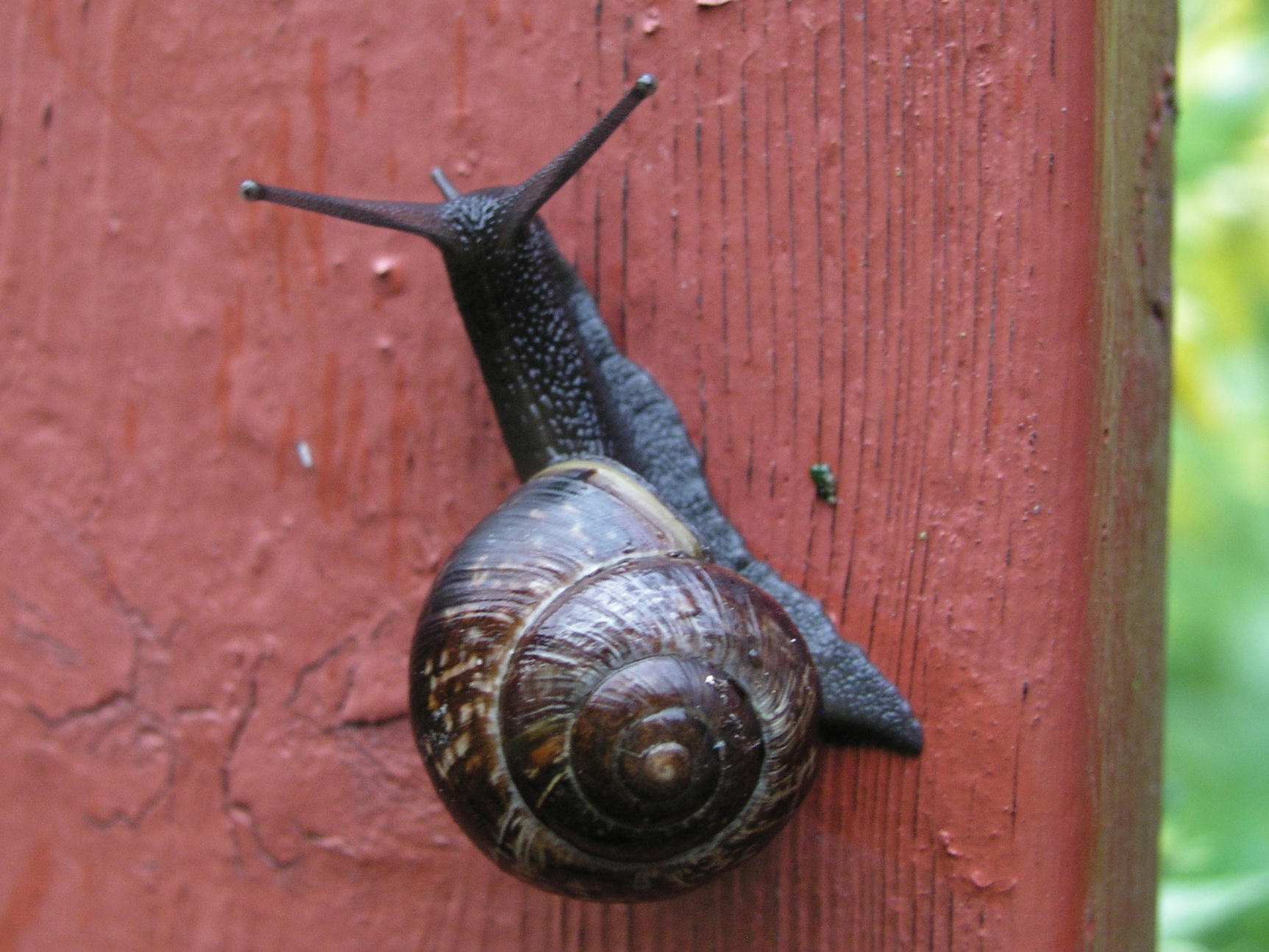
- Arianta arbustorum

Scientific classification
- Kingdom: Animalia
- Phylum: Mollusca
- Class: Gastropoda
- Order: Stylommatophora
- Superfamily: Helicoidea
- Family: Helicidae
- Subfamily: Ariantinae
- Genus: Arianta; Turton, 1831

Synonyms
- Altarianta Schileyko, 2013; Arionta Martens, 1860; Helicigona (Arianta) W. Turton, 1831; Helix (Arionta) Martens, 1860 (unjustified emendation of Arianta)

= Arianta =

Genus of gastropods

Arianta is a medium-sized genus of European land snails, terrestrial pulmonate gastropod mollusks in the family Helicidae.

Species of snails within this genus make and use calcareous love darts.

== Species ==
Species within the genus Arianta include:

- Arianta aethyops (Bielz, 1851)
- Arianta arbustorum (Linnaeus, 1758)
- Arianta chamaeleon (Pfeiffer, 1868)
- Arianta frangepanii (Kormos, 1906)
- Arianta hessei (M. Kimakowicz, 1883)
- Arianta picea (Rossmässler, 1837)
- Arianta schmidtii (Rossmässler, 1836)
- Arianta stenzii (Rossmässler, 1835)
- Arianta xatartii (Farines, 1834)
