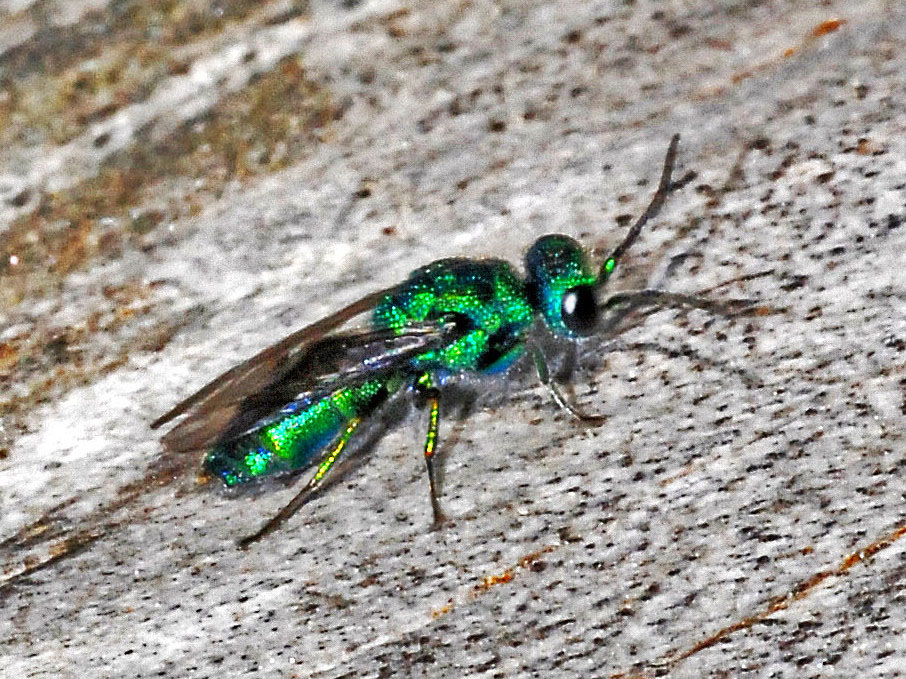
- Trichrysis cyanea

Scientific classification
- Kingdom: Animalia
- Phylum: Arthropoda
- Class: Insecta
- Order: Hymenoptera
- Family: Chrysididae
- Tribe: Chrysidini
- Genus: Trichrysis; Lichtenstein, 1876

= Trichrysis =

Genus of wasps

Trichrysis is a genus of cuckoo wasps, insects in the family Chrysididae.

== Description ==
The body is elongated. The posterior margin of the third tergite of the abdomen shows three small wide teeth.

== Species ==
Species within this genus include:

- Trichrysis baratzensis Strumia, 2010
- Trichrysis cyanea (Linnaeus, 1758)
- Trichrysis lacerta (Semenov, 1954)
- Trichrysis seducta (Smith, 1860)
