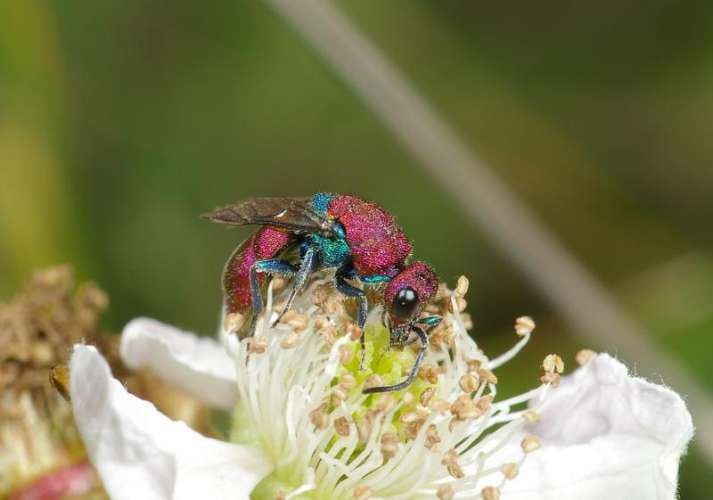

Scientific classification
- Kingdom: Animalia
- Phylum: Arthropoda
- Class: Insecta
- Order: Hymenoptera
- Family: Chrysididae
- Genus: Chrysura
- Species: C. cuprea

Binomial name
- Chrysura cuprea (Rossi, 1790)

Synonyms
- Chrysis cuprea Rossi, 1790

= Chrysura cuprea =

Species of wasp

Chrysura cuprea is a species of cuckoo wasps (insects in the family Chrysididae).

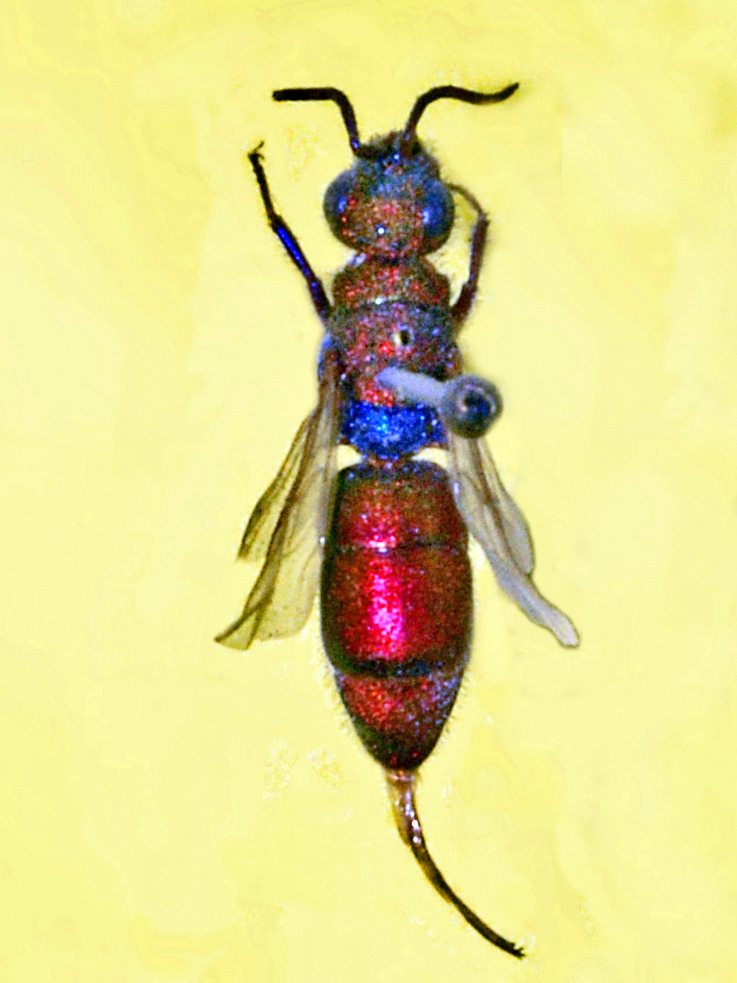
Chrysura cuprea. Museum specimen

== Description ==
Chrysura cuprea can reach a length of 6–10 millimetres (0.24–0.39 in). Body is almost entirely metallic golden-red, only the sides of the rear part of the chest and the legs are metallic bluish.

== Biology ==
Chrysura cuprea fly from May to July. The larvae live as parasites of larvae of Osmia species.

== Distribution ==
These quite uncommon wasps can be found in the area of Southern and Central Europe and in North Africa.

== Habitat ==
They prefer temperature-favored regions with little vegetation, especially dry grasslands and rocky slopes.

== Bibliography ==
- Heiko Bellmann: Bienen, Wespen, Ameisen. Hautflügler Mitteleuropas. Franckh-Kosmos Verlags-GmbH & Co KG, Stuttgart 1995, ISBN 3-440-09690-4.
