= Cyphomenes anisitsii =

Scientific classification
- Kingdom: Animalia
- Phylum: Arthropoda
- Clade: Pancrustacea
- Class: Insecta
- Order: Hymenoptera
- Family: Vespidae
- Genus: Cyphomenes
- Species: C. anisitsii

Binomial name
- Cyphomenes anisitsii Brèthes, 1906

Species of potter wasp

Cyphomenes anisitsii is a species of insect in the genus Cyphomenes and the family Eumenidae native to Mexico, Guatemala, and Venezuela first described by Juan Brèthes in 1906. As of 2018, one subspecies is listed in the Catalogue of Life, Cyphomenes anisitsii ornatissmus.

Female Cyphomenes anisitsii make mud nests in lichen growing on tree trunks and camouflage their nests with additional lichen.
