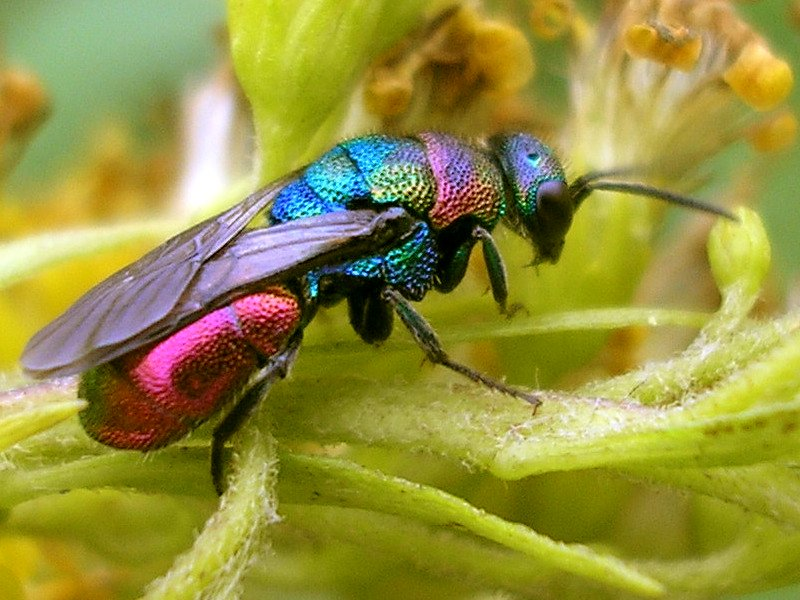
- Hedychrum rutilans

Scientific classification
- Domain: Eukaryota
- Kingdom: Animalia
- Phylum: Arthropoda
- Class: Insecta
- Order: Hymenoptera
- Family: Chrysididae
- Subfamily: Chrysidinae

Tribes
- Allocoeliini; Chrysidini; Elampini; Kimseyini; Parnopini

= Chrysidinae =

Subfamily of wasps

The subfamily Chrysidinae contains those species that are most commonly recognized as cuckoo wasps, being by far the largest and most familiar subfamily. The group contains 3000 species with 48 genera worldwide. They are highly sculptured, with brilliantly metallic-colored bodies, covering the entire spectrum, but primarily blues and greens.

== Taxonomy and Range ==
The subfamily Chrysidinae is divided into five tribes: Chrysidini, Elampini, Parnopini, Kimseyini, and Allocoeliini, the first two of which are abundant and widespread. Allocoeliini is found in South Africa and the Kimseyini has a single genus and species in Uzbekistan.

== Ecology ==
Chrysidinae are the most diverse in desert regions of the world, as they are typically associated with solitary bee and wasp species, which are also the most diverse in such areas. They are very active in dry, warm, and open areas between the months of May and August. The adults consume flower nectar, while looking for nests for their eggs.

== Appearance ==
The Chrysidinae have terga that are strongly convex, with a laterotergite not seen easily, ventrally around the sterna. The sterna of this subfamily is flat or concave and not seen from the lateral view. The females and males have three visible metasomal segments, while the parnopine males have four. The internally retracted metasomal segments are genital or egg-laying tubes. The female sting apparatus has been modified into an egg-laying tube and they cannot sting in defense. The metasoma acts as a mechanism for protection when entering a host nest. They are capable of folding their metasoma up against their head and thorax, covering most of their legs and lower head.

== Reproduction ==
Their characteristic "scurry and fly" search pattern when looking for hosts is quite distinctive, even when seen from a distance. They land on a surface, typically either soil or wood, and scurry a short distance, in quick, hesitant spurts, with their antennae quivering vigorously as they go - and then they abruptly take off, typically only flying a short distance before landing again and repeating the maneuver. These wasps are brood parasitoids of crabronid wasps, bees, and eumenine vespids. They are generally kleptoparasites, laying their eggs in host nests, where their larvae consume the host, egg, or larva while it is still young, then consuming the provisions. The ovipositor is tube-like, and used to slip the eggs into the host nests. These wasps' only defenses, therefore, are passive; the heavily sculpted integument (which reduces the risk of being bitten or stung by an angry host), and their ability to cover up their vulnerable limbs and appendages when threatened by rolling up (much like an armadillo).
