= Dabchick =

Dabchick may refer to:

- The little grebe (Tachybaptus ruficollis), also known as dabchick
- The New Zealand dabchick or weweia (Poliocephalus rufopectus)
- The Dabchick sailing dinghy
- People from Aldbourne, England
