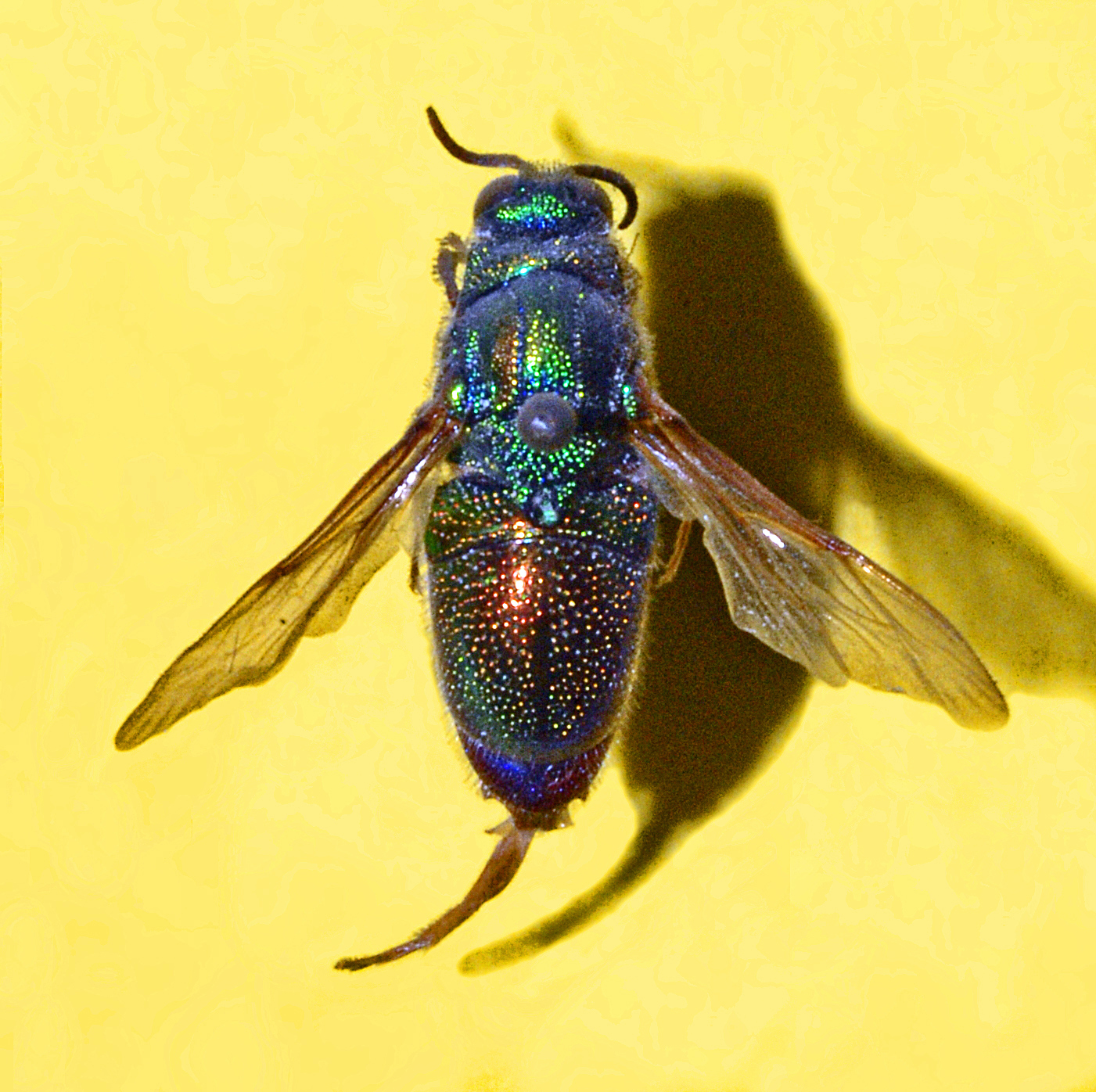
- Stilbum cyanurum. Museum specimen

Scientific classification
- Kingdom: Animalia
- Phylum: Arthropoda
- Class: Insecta
- Order: Hymenoptera
- Family: Chrysididae
- Genus: Stilbum
- Species: S. cyanurum

Binomial name
- Stilbum cyanurum (Förster, 1771)

Synonyms
- Chrysis cyanura Forster, 1771; Chrysis amethystina Fabricius, 1775; Chrysis splendida Fabricius, 1775; Stilbum splendidum (Fabricius, 1775); Chrysis nobilis Sulzer, 1776; Stilbum nobile (Sulzer, 1776); Chrysis punctatissima Villers, 1789; Stilbum wesmaeli Dahlbom, 1845; Chrysis spinolae Montrouzier, 1864; Stilbum variolatum Costa, 1864; Stilbum siculum Tournier, 1878; Stilbum cyanurum leveillei Buysson, 1891; Stilbum cyanurum macedonicum Trautmann, 1926; Stilbum calens ab. subcalens Mader, 1933 Unav.; Stilbum cyanurum parcepunctatum Mader, 1933; Stilbum pacificum Linsenmaier, 1951; Stilbum calens subcalens Linsenmaier, 1959; Stilbum cyanurum sokotranum Linsenmaier, 1987

= Stilbum cyanurum =

Species of wasp

Stilbum cyanurum, is a large Old World species of cuckoo wasps (insects in the family Chrysididae).

== Description ==
Stilbum cyanurum can reach a length of about 20 millimetres (0.79 in). The colour range of this widespread species is considerable, with typical specimens mostly bluish green to bluish-violet, but varying to reddish gold.

== Biology ==
These wasps lay their eggs in the nests of various potter wasps (Delta unguiculatum, Katamenes arbustorum), sphecid wasps (Sceliphron caementarium, Sceliphron destillatorium and Sceliphron madraspatanum), and megachilid bees (Megachile).

== Distribution ==
This widespread species is present in southern Europe, North Africa, the Afrotropical Region, Australian Region, East Palearctic ecozone, Near East, and Oriental Region.
