= Plywood =

Manufactured wood panel made from thin sheets of wood veneer

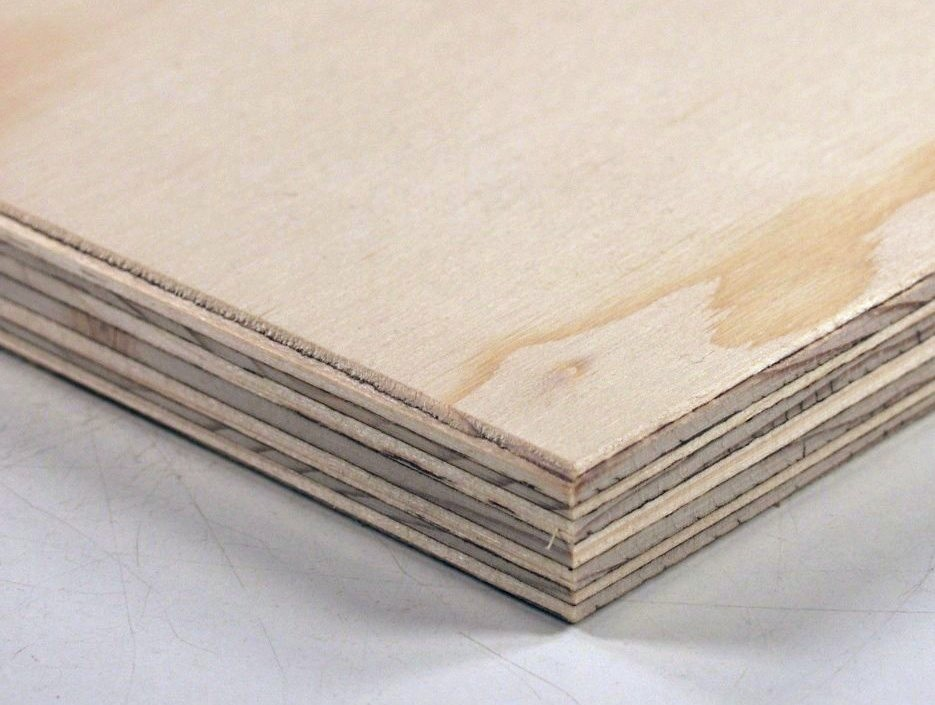
Softwood plywood made from spruce

The principle of making plywood

Plywood is a composite material manufactured from many thin layers, or "plies", of wood veneer that have been stacked and glued together. It is an engineered wood from the family of manufactured boards, which include plywood, medium-density fibreboard (MDF), oriented strand board (OSB), and particle board (or chipboard).

All plywoods bind resin and wood fibre sheets (cellulose cells are long, strong and thin) to form a composite material. The sheets of wood are stacked such that each layer has its grain set typically (see below) perpendicular to its adjacent layers. This alternation of the grain is called cross-graining and has several important benefits: it reduces the tendency of wood to split when nailed at the edges; it reduces thickness swelling and shrinkage, providing improved dimensional stability; and it makes the strength of the panel consistent across all directions. There is usually an odd number of plies, so that the sheet is balanced, that is, the surface layers have their grains set parallel to one another. This balance reduces warping. Because plywood is bonded with grains running against one another and with an odd number of composite parts, it has high stiffness perpendicular to the grain direction of the surface ply.

Smaller, thinner, and lower-quality plywoods may only have their plies (layers) arranged at right angles to each other. Some better-quality plywood products by design have five plies in steps of 45 degrees (0, 45, 90, 135, and 180 degrees), giving strength in multiple axes.

The word ply derives from the French verb plier, "to fold", from the Latin verb plico, from the ancient Greek verb πλέκω.

== Structural characteristics ==
A typical plywood panel has face veneers of a higher grade than the core veneers. The principal function of the core layers is to increase the separation between the outer layers where the bending stresses are highest, thus increasing the panel's resistance to bending. As a result, thicker panels can span greater distances under the same loads. In bending, the maximum stress occurs in the outermost layers, one in tension, the other in compression. Bending stress decreases from the maximum at the face layers to nearly zero at the central layer. Shear stress, by contrast, is higher in the center of the panel, and at the outer fibres. Within Europe basic plywood can be divided into three main categories: birch plywood (density approx. 680 kg/m^{3}), mixed plywood (density approx. 620 kg/m^{3}) and conifer plywoods (density 460–520 kg/m^{3}).

== Types ==
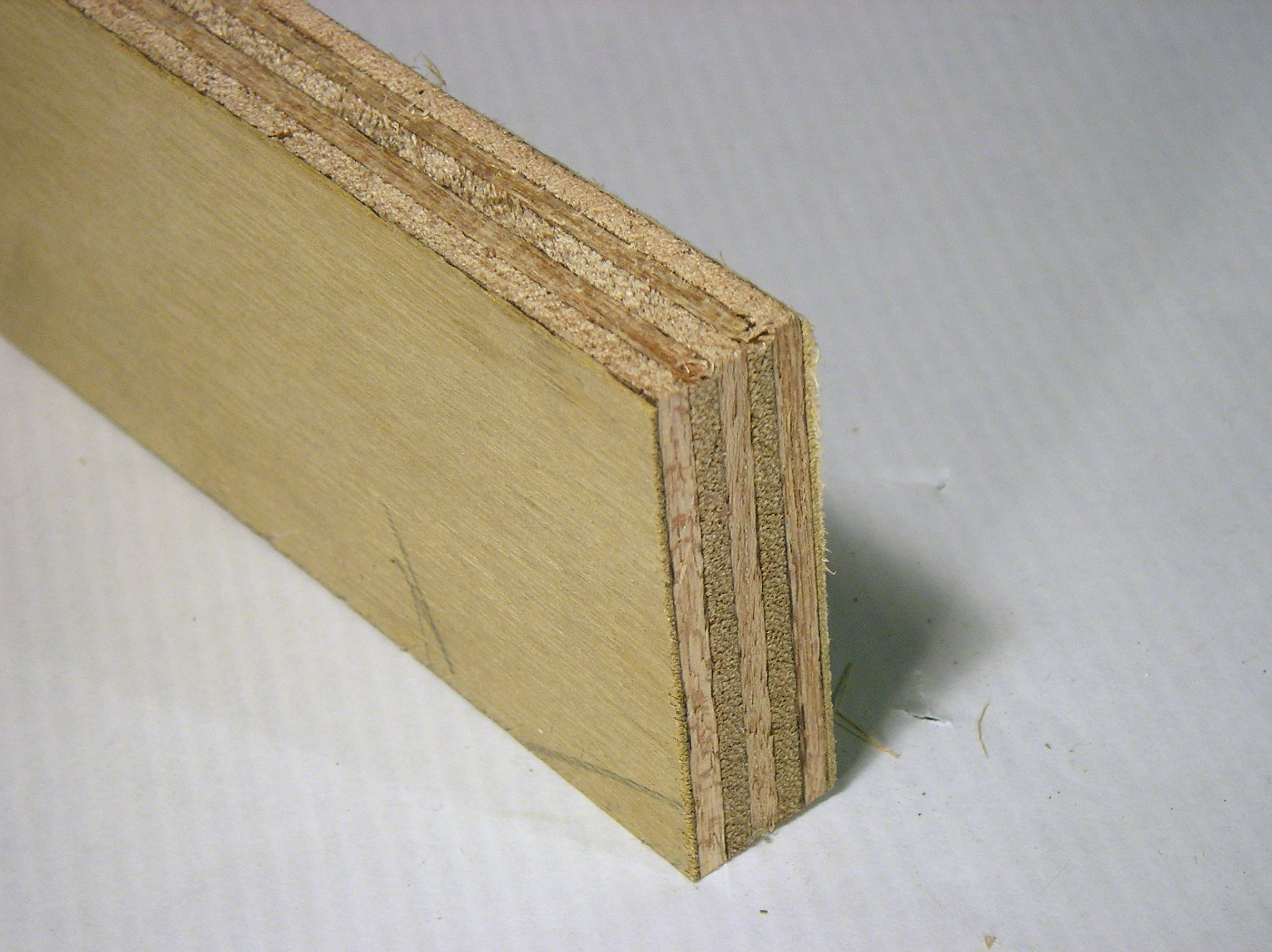
Average-quality plywood with 'show veneer'

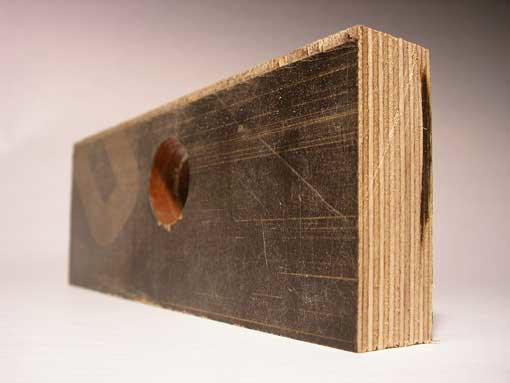
High-quality concrete pouring plate in plywood

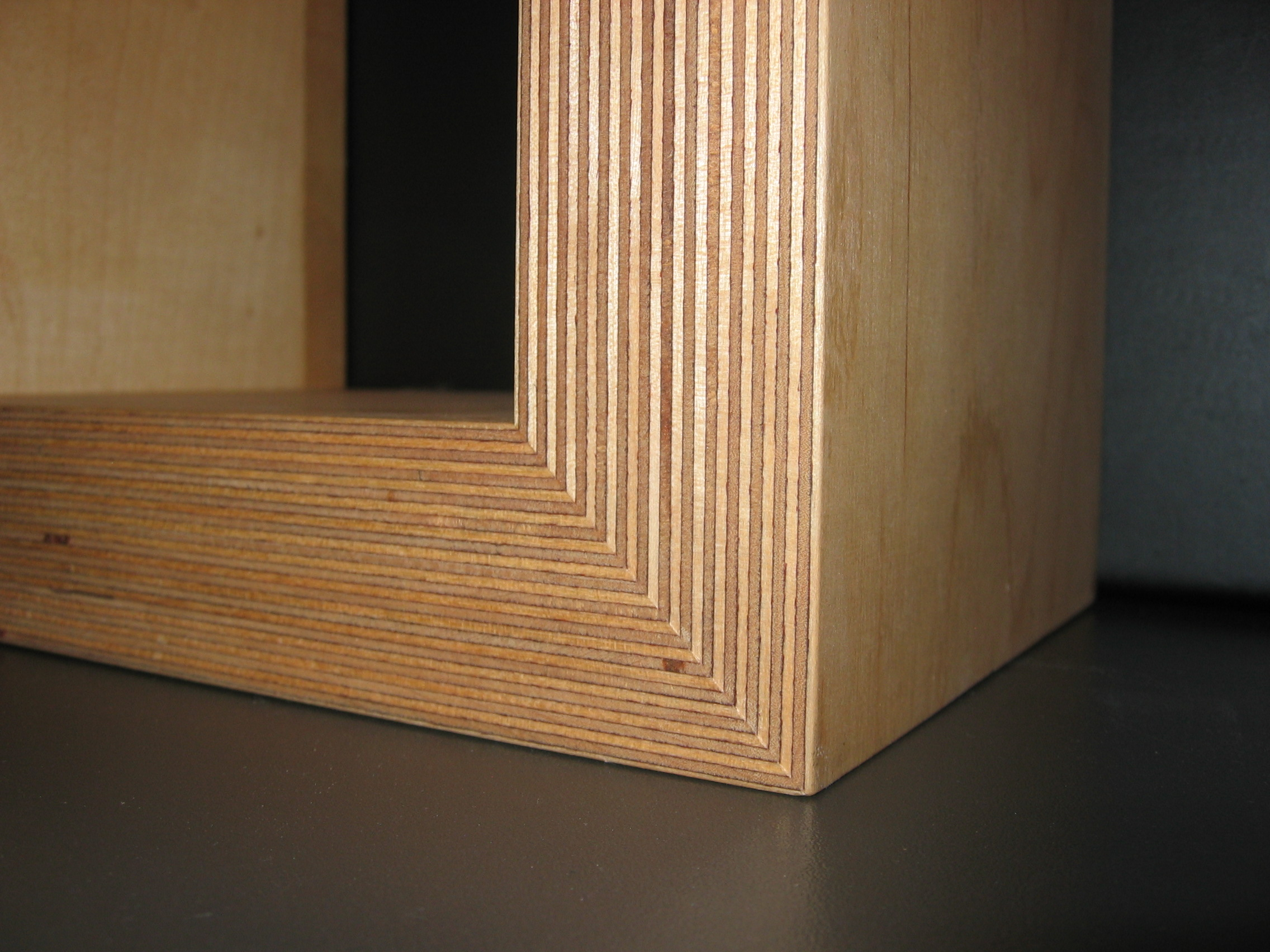
Extremely high-quality 29-ply Birch plywood

Different varieties of plywood exist for different applications:

=== Softwood ===
Softwood plywood is usually made either of cedar, Douglas fir or spruce, pine, and fir (collectively known as spruce-pine-fir or SPF) or redwood and is typically used for construction and industrial purposes.

The most common dimension is 1.2 by 2.4 metres (3 ft 11 in × 7 ft 10 in) or the slightly larger imperial dimension of 4 feet × 8 feet. Plies vary in thickness from 1.4 mm to 4.3 mm. The number of plies—which is always odd—depends on the thickness and grade of the sheet. Roofing can use the thinner 16-millimetre (5/8 in) plywood. Subfloors are at least 19 millimetres (3/4 in) thick, the thickness depending on the distance between floor joists. Plywood for flooring applications is often tongue and groove (T&G); This prevents one board from moving up or down relative to its neighbor, providing a solid-feeling floor when the joints do not lie over joists. T&G plywood is usually found in the 13-to-25-millimetre (1/2 to 1 in) range.

=== Hardwood ===
Hardwood plywood is made out of wood from dicot trees (oak, beech and mahogany) and used for demanding end uses. Hardwood plywood is characterized by its excellent strength, stiffness, durability and resistance to creep. It has a high planar shear strength and impact resistance, which make it especially suitable for heavy-duty floor and wall structures. Oriented plywood construction has a high wheel-carrying capacity. Hardwood plywood has excellent surface hardness, and damage- and wear-resistance.

=== Tropical ===
Tropical plywood is made of mixed hardwood species of tropical timber. Originally from the Asian region, it is now also manufactured in African and South American countries. Tropical plywood is superior to softwood plywood due to its density, strength, evenness of layers, and high quality. It is usually sold at a premium in many markets if manufactured with high standards. Tropical plywood is widely used in the UK, Japan, United States, Taiwan, Korea, Dubai, and other countries worldwide. It is used for construction purposes in many regions due to its low cost. However, many countries' forests have been over-harvested, including the Philippines, Malaysia and Indonesia, largely due to the demand for plywood production and export.

=== Aircraft ===
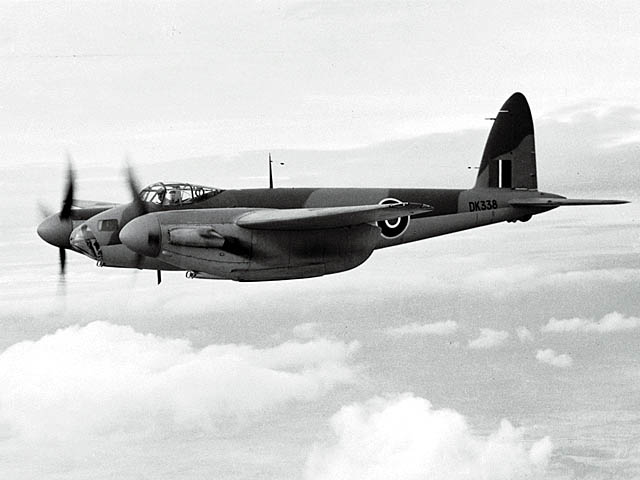
De Havilland DH-98 Mosquito was made of curved and glued veneers

High-strength plywood, also known as aircraft plywood, is made from mahogany, spruce and/or birch using adhesives with an increased resistance to heat and humidity. It was used in the construction of air assault gliders during World War II and also several fighter aircraft, most notably the multi-role British De Havilland Mosquito. Nicknamed "The Wooden Wonder", plywood was used for the wing surfaces, and also flat sections such as bulkheads and the webs of the wing spars. The fuselage had exceptional rigidity from the bonded ply-balsa-ply 'sandwich' of its monocoque shell; elliptical in cross-section, it was formed in two separate mirror-image halves, using curved moulds.

Structural aircraft-grade plywood is most commonly manufactured from African mahogany, spruce or birch veneers that are bonded together in a hot press over hardwood cores of basswood or poplar or from European Birch veneers throughout. Basswood is another type of aviation-grade plywood that is lighter and more flexible than mahogany and birch plywood but has slightly less structural strength. Aviation-grade plywood is manufactured to a number of specifications including those outlined since 1931 in the Germanischer Lloyd Rules for Surveying and Testing of Plywood for Aircraft and MIL-P-607, the latter of which calls for shear testing after immersion in boiling water for three hours to verify the adhesive qualities between the plies meets specifications. Aircraft grade plywood is made from three or more plies of birch, as thin as 0.40 millimetres (1/64 in) thick in total, and is extremely strong and light.

Howard Hughes' H-4 Hercules was constructed of plywood. The plane was built by the Hughes Aircraft Company employing a plywood-and-resin Duramold process. The specialized wood veneer was made by Roddis Manufacturing in Marshfield, Wisconsin.

=== Decorative (overlaid) ===
Usually faced with hardwood, including ash, oak, red oak, birch, maple, mahogany, shorea (often called lauan, meranti, or Philippine mahogany, though having no relation to true mahogany), rosewood, teak and a large number of other hardwoods.

=== Flexible ===
Flexible plywood is designed for making curved parts, a practice which dates back to the 1850s in furniture making. At 3/8 inch (9.5 mm) thick, mahogany three-ply "wiggle board" or "bendy board" come in 4 by 8 feet (1.2 m × 2.4 m) sheets with a very thin cross-grain central ply and two thicker exterior plies, either long grain on the sheet, or cross grain. Wiggle board is often glued together in two layers once it is formed into the desired curve, so that the final shape will be stiff and resist movement. Often, decorative wood veneers are added as a surface layer.

In the United Kingdom single-ply sheets of veneer were used to make stove pipe hats in Victorian times, so flexible modern plywood is sometimes known there as "hatters ply", although the original material was not strictly plywood, but a single sheet of veneer.

=== Marine ===
Marine plywood is manufactured from durable face and core veneers, with few defects so it performs longer in both humid and wet conditions and resists delaminating and fungal attack. Its construction is such that it can be used in environments where it is exposed to moisture for long periods. Each wood veneer will be from tropical hardwoods and have negligible core gap, limiting the chance of trapping water in the plywood and hence providing a solid and stable glue bond. It uses an exterior Weather and Boil Proof (WBP) glue similar to most exterior plywoods.

Marine plywood can be graded under BS 1088, which is a British Standard for marine plywood and under IS:710, an Indian Standard for marine grade plywood. There are few international standards for grading marine plywood and most of the standards are voluntary. Some marine plywood has a Lloyd's of London stamp that certifies it to be BS 1088 compliant. Some plywood is also labeled based on the wood used to manufacture it. Examples of this are Okoumé or Meranti.

In the UK, one can find builders' merchants advertising a grade of ply as "marine ply" that does not conform to BS 1088 - generally online adverts for these products will include a caveat along the lines of "not suitable for boat".

In India, marine ply is popularly called "Kitply" after the brand which popularised the concept of water proof marine plywood in the 1980s.

=== Other ===
Other types of plywoods include fire-retardant, moisture-resistant, wire mesh, sign-grade, or even pressure-treated. However, the plywood may be treated with various chemicals to improve the plywood's fireproofing. Each of these products is designed to fill a need in industry.

Baltic Birch plywood is a product of an area around the Baltic Sea. Originally manufactured for European cabinet makers but now popular in the United States as well. It is very stable composed of an inner void-free core of cross-banded birch plys with an exterior grade adhesive. The face veneers are thicker than traditional cabinets.

== Production ==
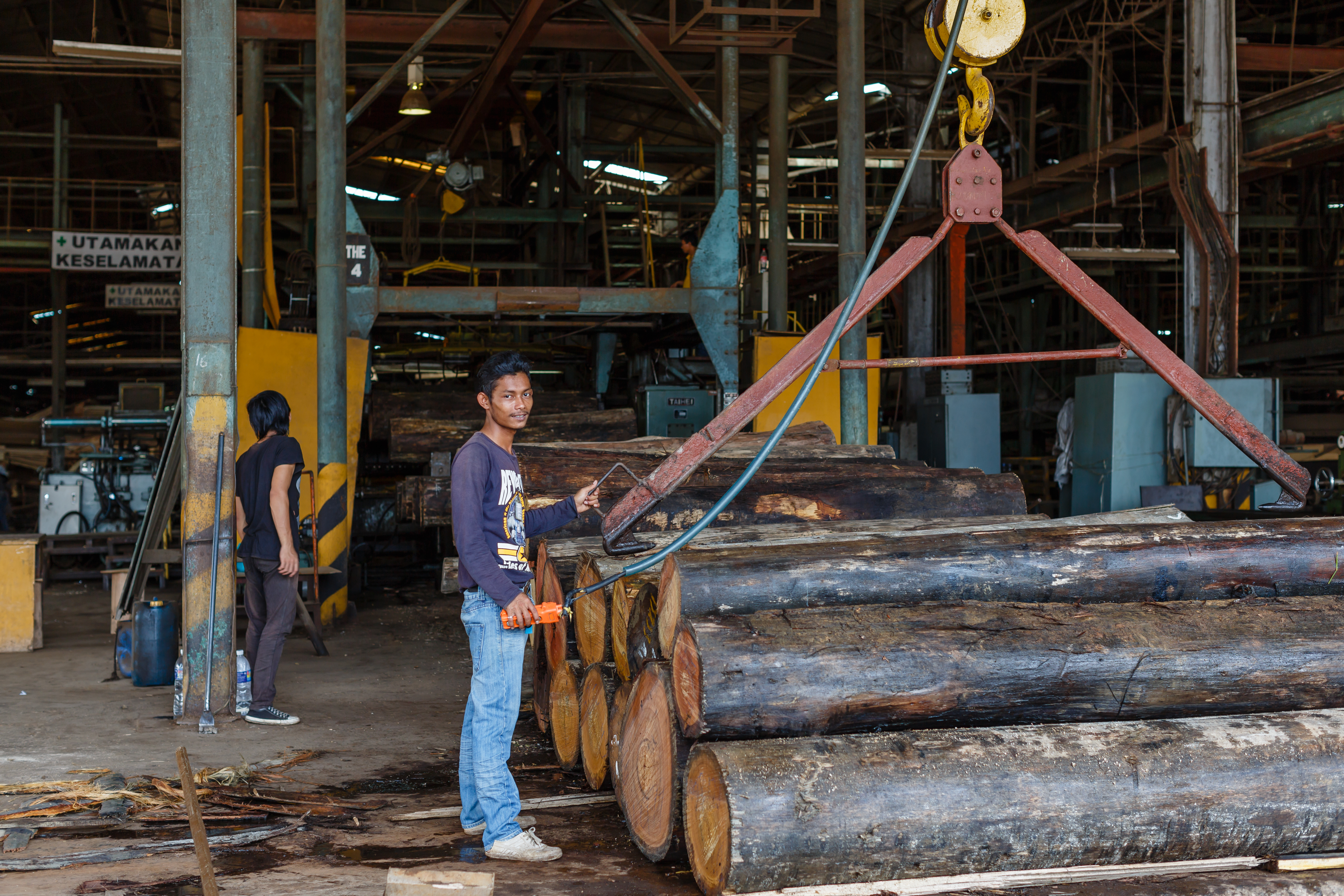
Logs for plywood construction in a plywood factory

Plywood production requires a good log, called a peeler, which is generally straighter and larger in diameter than one required for processing into dimensioned lumber by a sawmill. The log is laid horizontally and rotated about its long axis while a long blade is pressed into it, causing a thin layer of wood to peel off (much as a continuous sheet of paper from a roll). An adjustable nosebar, which may be solid or a roller, is pressed against the log during rotation, to create a "gap" for veneer to pass through between the knife and the nosebar. The nosebar partly compresses the wood as it is peeled; it controls vibration of the peeling knife; and assists in keeping the veneer being peeled to an accurate thickness. In this way the log is peeled into sheets of veneer, which are then cut to the desired oversize dimensions, to allow it to shrink (depending on wood species) when dried. The sheets are then patched, graded, glued together and then baked in a press at a temperature of at least 140 °C (284 °F), and at a pressure of up to 1.9 MPa (280 psi) (but more commonly 1.4 MPa [200 psi]) to form the plywood panel. The panel can then be patched, have minor surface defects such as splits or small knot holes filled, re-sized, sanded or otherwise refinished, depending on the market for which it is intended.

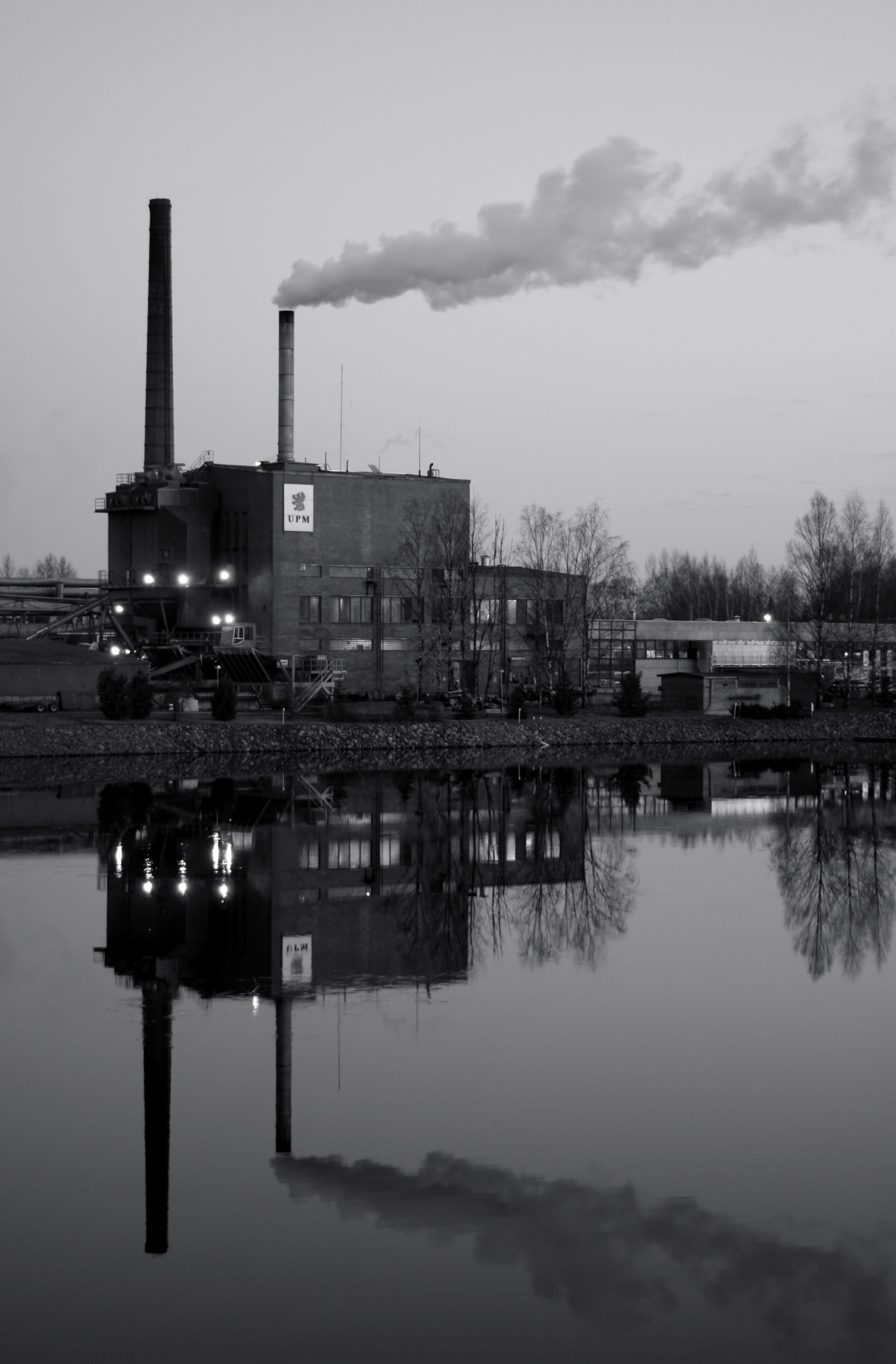
A plywood mill in Joensuu, Finland

Plywood for indoor use generally uses the less expensive urea-formaldehyde glue, which has limited water resistance, while outdoor and marine-grade plywood are designed to withstand moisture, and use a water-resistant resorcinol-formaldehyde or phenol-formaldehyde glue to prevent delamination and to retain strength in high humidity.

The adhesives used in plywood have become a point of concern. Both urea formaldehyde and phenol formaldehyde are carcinogenic in very high concentrations. As a result, many manufacturers are turning to low formaldehyde-emitting glue systems, denoted by an "E" rating. Plywood produced to "E0" has effectively zero formaldehyde emissions.

In addition to the glues being brought to the forefront, the wood resources themselves are becoming the focus of manufacturers, due in part to energy conservation, as well as concern for natural resources. There are several certifications available to manufacturers who participate in these programs. Programme for the Endorsement of Forest Certification (PEFC) Forest Stewardship Council (FSC), Leadership in Energy and Environmental Design (LEED), Sustainable Forestry Initiative (SFI), and Greenguard are all certification programs that ensure that production and construction practices are sustainable. Many of these programs offer tax benefits to both the manufacturer and the end user.

== Sizes ==
The most commonly used thickness range is from 1/8 to 3 inches (3.2–76.2 mm). The sizes of the most commonly used plywood sheets are 4 by 8 feet (1,220 mm × 2,440 mm) which was first used by the Portland Manufacturing Company, who developed modern veneer core plywood for the 1905 Portland World Fair. A common metric size for a sheet of plywood is 1200 × 2400 mm. 5 × 5 feet (1,500 × 1,500 mm) is also a common European size for Baltic birch ply, and aircraft ply.

Sizes on specialised plywood for concrete-forming can range from 15/64 to 13/16 in (6 to 21 mm), and a multitude of formats exist, though 15 × 750 × 1,500 mm (.59in × 30 × 59 in) (19/32in × 2 ft-6in × 4 ft-11in) is very commonly used.

Aircraft plywood is available in thicknesses of 1/8 inch (3 mm) (3-ply construction) and upwards; typically aircraft plywood uses veneers of 0.5 mm (approx 1/64 in) thickness although much thinner veneers such as 0.1 mm are also used in construction of some of the thinner panels.

== Grades ==
Grading rules differ according to the country of origin. The most popular standards are the British Standard (BS) and the American Standard (ASTM). Joyce (1970), however, list some general indication of grading rules:

Typical Western grades, after Joyce
Grade	Description
A	Face and back veneers practically free from all defects.
A/B	Face veneers practically free from all defects. Reverse veneers with only a few small knots or discolorations.
A/BB	Face as A but reverse side permitting jointed veneers, large knots, plugs, etc.
B	Both side veneers with only a few small knots or discolorations.
B/BB	Face veneers with only a few small knots or discolorations. Reverse side permitting jointed veneers, large knots, plugs, etc.
BB	Both sides permitting jointed veneers, large knots, plugs, etc.
C/D	For structural plywood, this grade means that the face has knots and defects filled in and the reverse may have some that are not filled. Neither face is an appearance grade, nor are they sanded smooth. This grade is often used for sheathing the surfaces of a building prior to being covered with another product like flooring, siding, masonry, or roofing materials.
WG	Guaranteed well glued only. All broken knots plugged.
X	Knots, knotholes, cracks, and all other defects permitted.
WBP	Weather and boil proof glue used in marine plywood. Designation replaced by EN 314-3.

Grades according to Japan Plywood Inspection Corporation (JPIC) Standards
Grade	Description
BB/CC	Face as BB, back as CC. BB as very little knots of less than 1/4 inches, slight discoloration, no decay, split and wormholes mended skillfully, matched colors, no blister, no wrinkle. Most popular choice for many applications like furniture, packing and construction.

== Applications ==
Plywood is used in many applications that need high-quality, high-strength sheet material. Quality in this context means resistance to cracking, breaking, shrinkage, twisting and warping.

Exterior glued plywood is suitable for outdoor use, but because moisture affects the strength of wood, optimal performance is achieved where the moisture content remains relatively low. Subzero conditions do not affect the dimensional or strength properties of plywood, making some special applications possible.

Plywood is also used as an engineering material for stressed-skin applications. It has been used for marine and aviation applications since WWII. Most notable is the British de Havilland Mosquito bomber, with a fuselage made of birch plywood sandwiching a balsa core, and using plywood extensively for the wings. Plywood was also used for the hulls in the hard-chine Motor Torpedo Boats (MTB) and Motor Gun Boats (MGB) built by the British Power Boat Company and Vosper's, American PT boats, and the Higgins landing craft critical to the D-Day landings. The American designers Charles and Ray Eames are known for their plywood-based furniture, as is Finnish Architect Alvar Aalto and his firm Artek, while Phil Bolger has designed a wide range of boats built primarily of plywood. Jack Köper of Cape Town designed the plywood Dabchick sailing dinghy, which as of 2015 is still sailed by large numbers of teenagers.

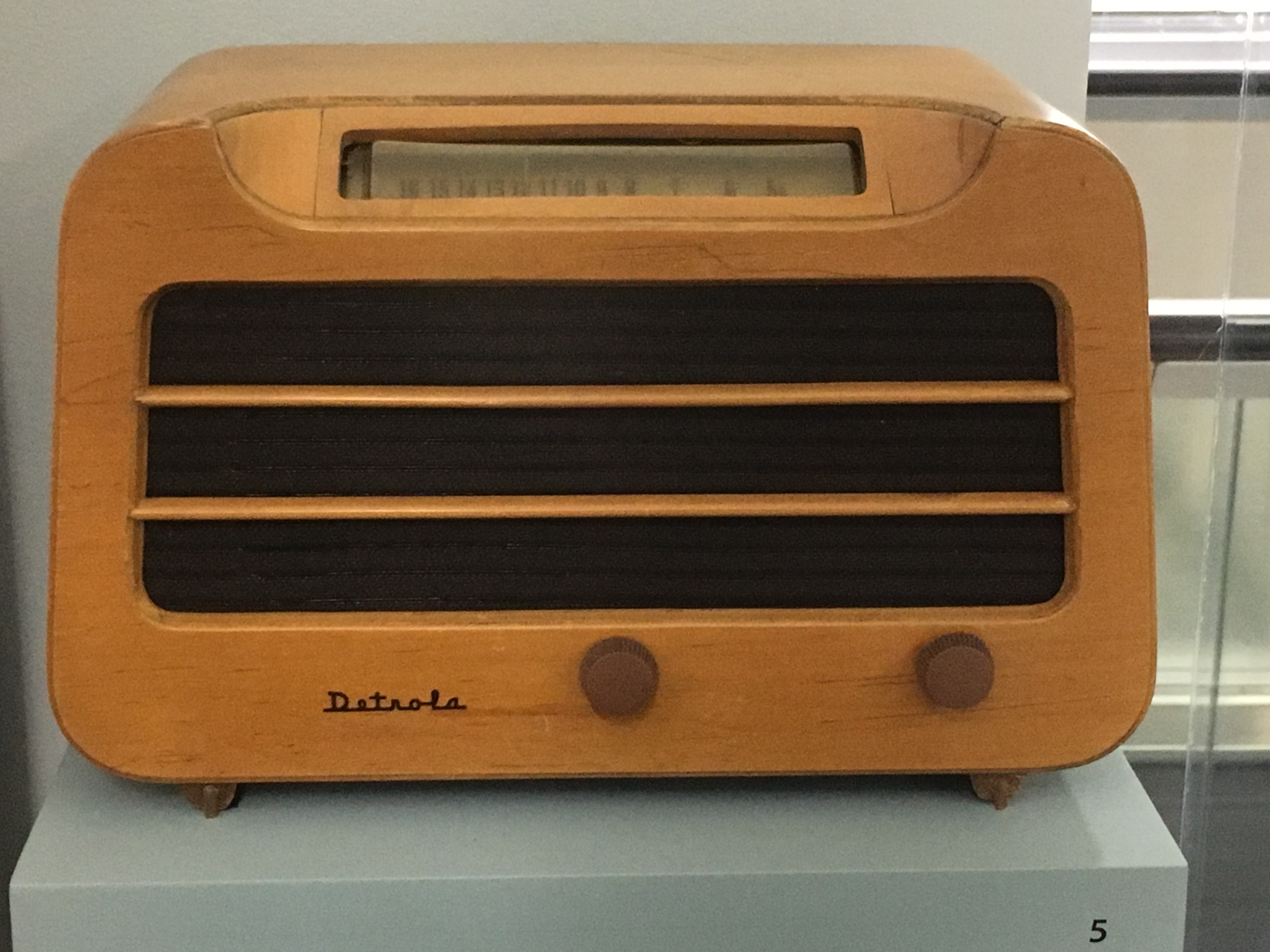
Detrola Model 579 (1946) radio, made of plywood

Plywood is often used to create curved surfaces because it can easily bend with the grain. Skateboard ramps often utilize plywood as the top smooth surface over bent curves to create transition that can simulate the shapes of ocean waves.

=== Softwood plywood ===
Typical end uses of spruce plywood are:

- Floors, walls, and roofs in home constructions
- Wind bracing panels
- Vehicle internal body work
- Packages and boxes
- Fencing

There are coating solutions available that mask the prominent grain structure of spruce plywood. For these coated plywoods there are some end uses where reasonable strength is needed but the lightness of spruce is a benefit, e.g.:

- Concrete shuttering panels
- Ready-to-paint surfaces for constructions

=== Hardwood plywood ===
Phenolic resin film coated (Film Faced) hardwood plywood is typically used as a ready-to-install component e.g.:

- Panels in concrete form work systems
- Floors, walls and roofs in transport vehicles
- Container floors
- Floors subjected to heavy wear in various buildings and factories
- Scaffolding materials

("Wire" or other styles of imprinting available for better traction)

Birch plywood is used as a structural material in special applications e.g.:

- Wind turbine blades
- Insulation boxes for liquefied natural gas (LNG) carriers

Smooth surface and accurate thickness combined with the durability of the material makes birch plywood a favorable material for many special end uses e.g.:

- High-end loud speakers
- Die-cutting boards
- Supporting structure for parquet
- Playground equipment
- Furniture
- Signs and fences for demanding outdoor advertising
- Musical instruments
- Sports equipment

=== Tropical plywood ===
Tropical plywood is widely available from the South-East Asia region, mainly from Malaysia and Indonesia.

- Common plywood
- Concrete panel
- Floor base
- Structure panel
- Container flooring
- Lamin board
- Laminated veneer lumber (LVL)

== History ==
Examples of rudimenary plywood date as far back to 2600 BC in ancient Egypt, but the use of plywood on an industrial scale doesn't emerge until the 1850s, most commonly as a moulded material used in furniture. John Henry Belter was a pioneer of this, patenting a technique for the production of chair backs in 1858. It wasn't until the 1880s that plywood began to be used on a larger scale.

== See also ==
- Pulpwood
