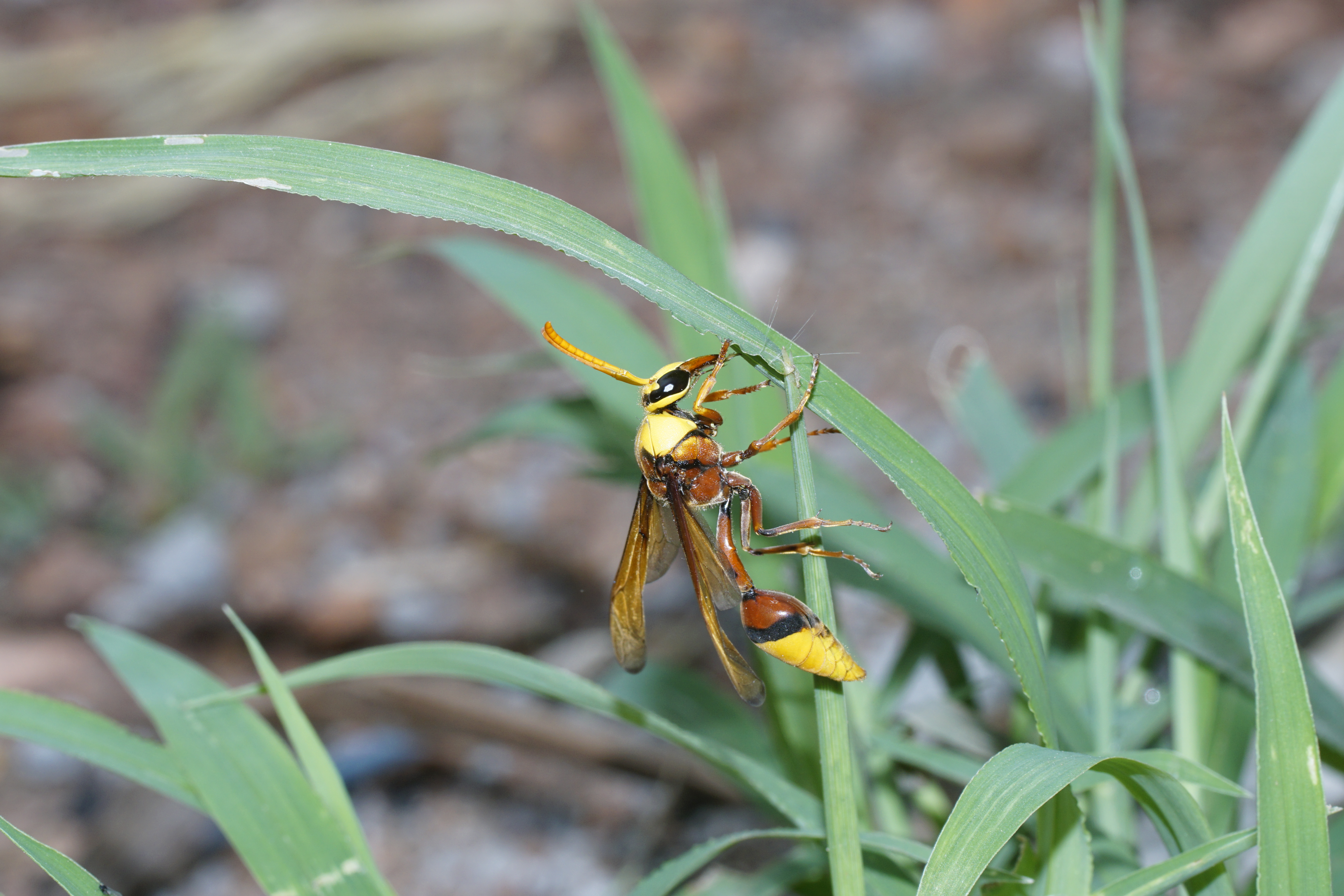
- Delta pyriforme from Kerala, India

Scientific classification
- Kingdom: Animalia
- Phylum: Arthropoda
- Class: Insecta
- Order: Hymenoptera
- Family: Vespidae
- Genus: Delta
- Species: D. pyriforme

Binomial name
- Delta pyriforme (Fabricius, 1775)

Synonyms
- Vespa petiolata Fabricius, 1781

= Delta pyriforme =

Species of wasp

Delta pyriforme is a species of potter wasp in the subfamily Eumeninae of the family Vespidae. They are distributed across Asia. Several populations are recognized:

- D. p. circinale (Fabricius, 1804)
- D. p. nigrocinctum Giordani Soika, 1993
- D. p. philippinense (Bequaert, 1928)
- D. p. pyriforme (Fabricius, 1775)

Delta pyriforme males have a yellow labrum and clypeus contrasting with the brown body colour. They also have a yellow pronotum and differ from Delta esuriens in lacking a yellow band on the petiole. Delta conoideum lacks yellow on the thorax.
