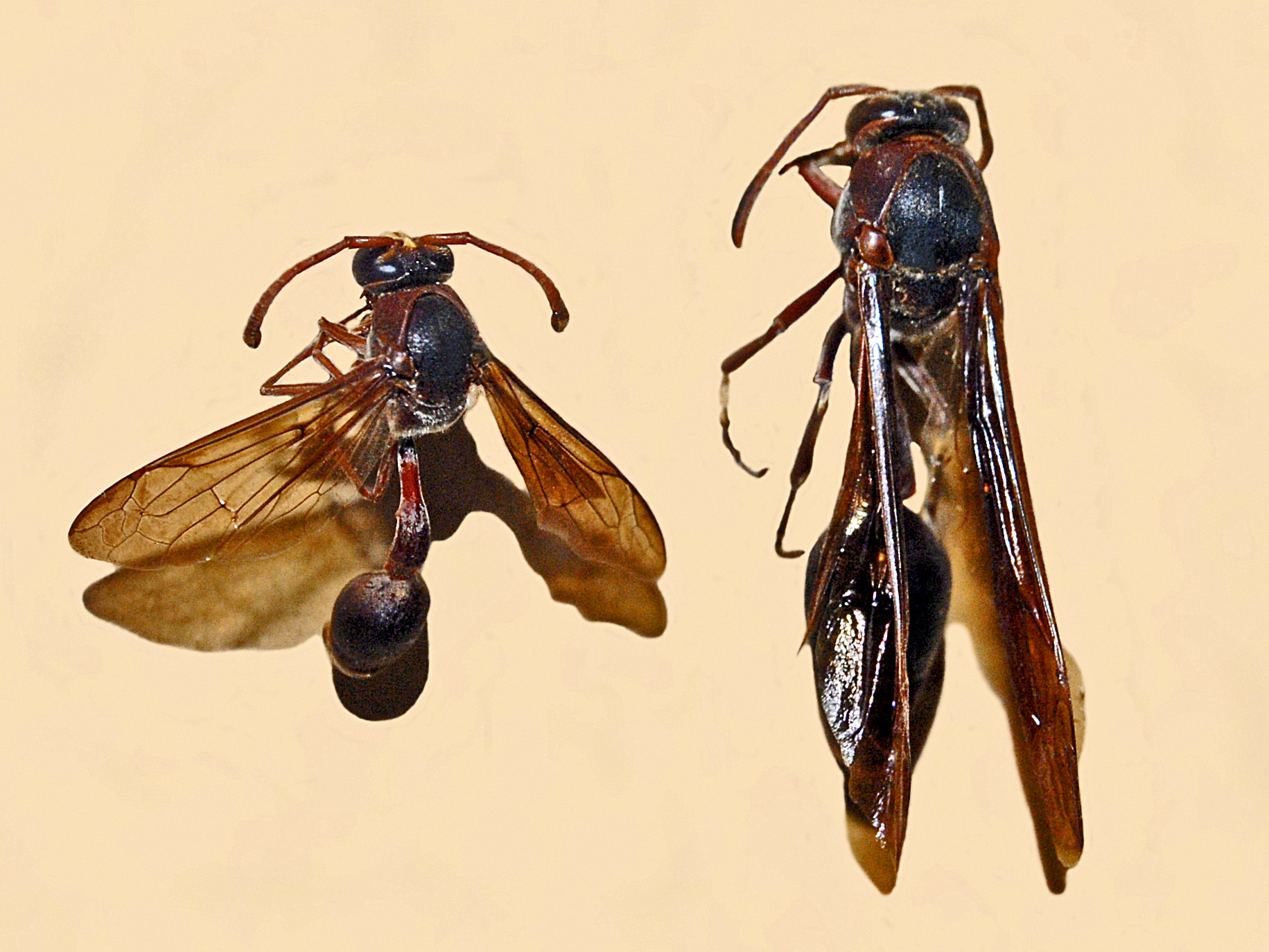
- Male and female in Guinea-Bissau

Scientific classification
- Kingdom: Animalia
- Phylum: Arthropoda
- Clade: Pancrustacea
- Class: Insecta
- Order: Hymenoptera
- Family: Vespidae
- Genus: Delta
- Species: D. emarginatum

Binomial name
- Delta emarginatum (Linnaeus, 1758)

Synonyms
- Vespa emarginata Linnaeus, 1758; Vespa capensis Linnaeus, 1767; Vespa maxillosa DeGeer, 1773; Sphex tinctor Christ, 1791; Vespa guineensis Fabricius, 1793; Eumenes maxillosus (DeGeer, 1773); Eumenes savignyi Guerin-Meneville, 1835; Eumenes tinctor v. ferruginea Magretti, 1885; Eumenes erythrospila Cameron, 1910

= Delta emarginatum =

Species of wasp

Delta emarginatum is a species of potter wasp in the subfamily Eumeninae of the family Vespidae.

== Description ==
Delta emarginatum can reach a length of about 35 mm (1.4 in) in females. The males are smaller than the females.

== Distribution ==
This species can be found in Namibia, Botswana, Libya, Egypt, Ethiopia, Somalia, Mozambique, Angola, Republic of the Congo, Cameroon, Gaboon, Liberia, Niger, Senegal, Mauritania, Central Sahara, Madagascar, Comoro Islands, Eritrea, Guinea-Bissau, Malawi, South Africa, Sudan, Democratic Republic of the Congo.
