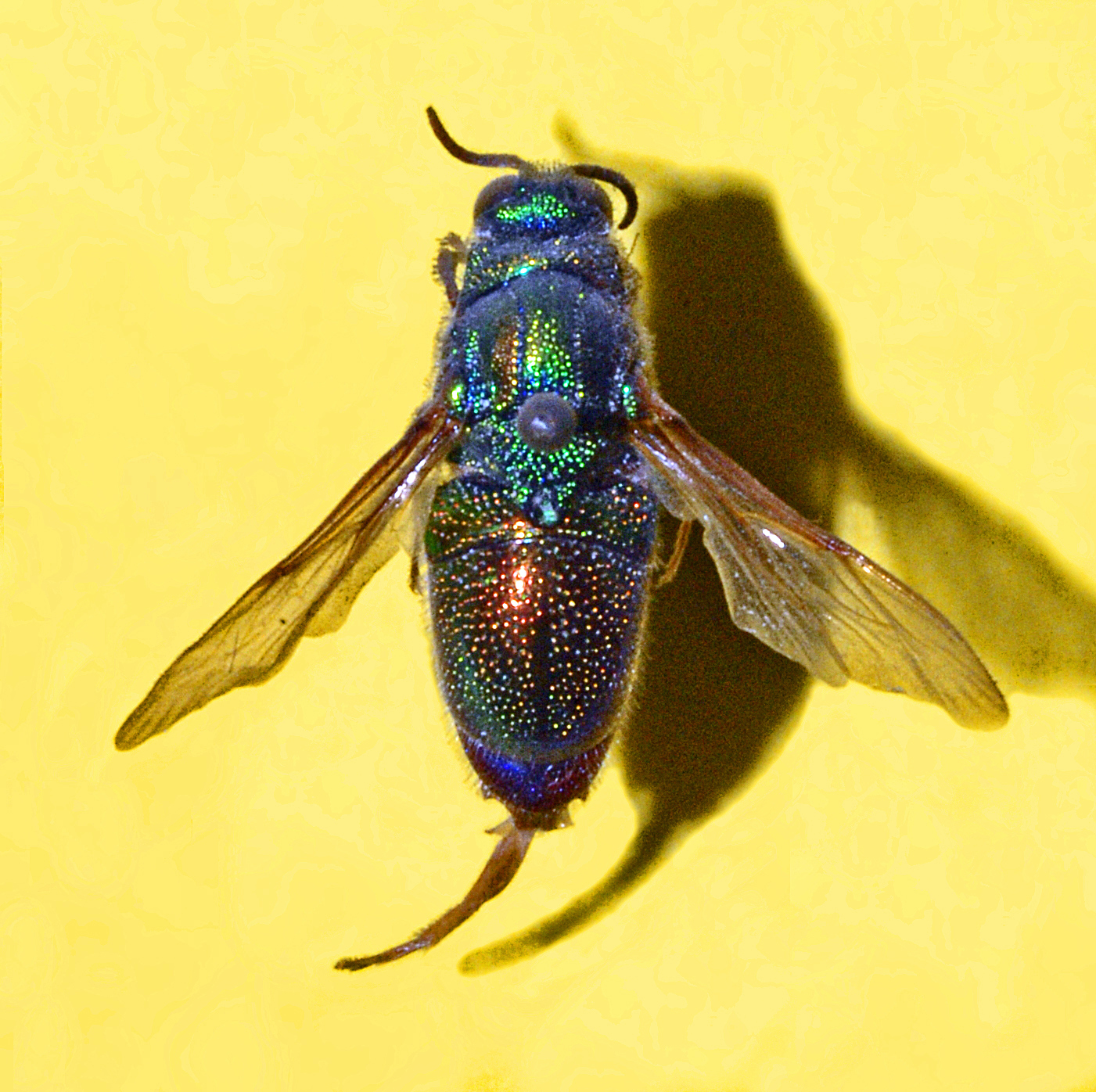
- Stilbum cyanurum

Scientific classification
- Kingdom: Animalia
- Phylum: Arthropoda
- Class: Insecta
- Order: Hymenoptera
- Family: Chrysididae
- Tribe: Chrysidini
- Genus: Stilbum; Spinola, 1806

= Stilbum =

Genus of wasps

Stilbum is a genus of cuckoo wasp (insects in the family Chrysididae).

== Species ==
- Stilbum calens (Fabricius, 1781)
- Stilbum chrysocephalum Buysson, 1896
- Stilbum cyanurum (Förster, 1771)
- Stilbum pici R. du Buysson, 1896
- Stilbum viride Guérin-Méneville, 1842
