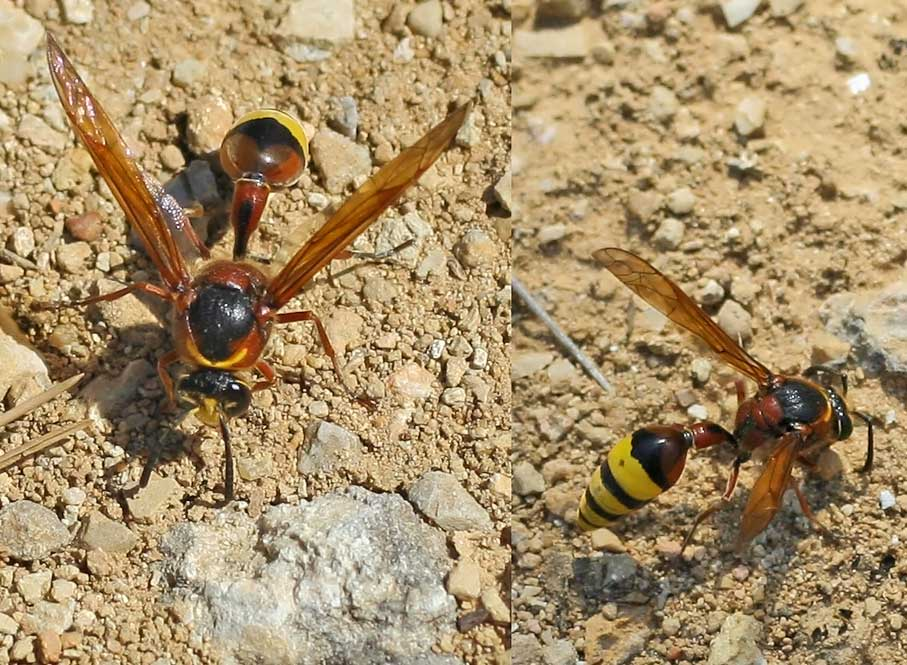
- Delta unguiculatum

Scientific classification
- Kingdom: Animalia
- Phylum: Arthropoda
- Class: Insecta
- Order: Hymenoptera
- Family: Vespidae
- Subfamily: Eumeninae
- Genus: Delta de Saussure, 1855

= Delta (wasp) =

Genus of wasps

Delta is an Old World genus of potter wasps with species predominantly distributed through tropical Africa and Asia. Some species are present in the Palearctic region, and a few have been introduced in the Nearctic and Neotropical regions. The members of this genus have a long metasomal petiole, like members of the genera Eumenes and Zeta.

== Species ==
The following are species of the genus Delta:

- Delta alluaudi (Pérez, 1895)
- Delta anomalum (Zavattari, 1909)
- Delta asina (de Saussure, 1852)
  - D. a. asina (de Saussure, 1852)
  - D. a. mixtum (Giordani Soika, 1944)
- Delta bicinctum (de Saussure, 1852)
- Delta bonellii (Giordani Soika, 1944)
- Delta caffra (Linnaeus, 1767)
- Delta campaniforme (Fabricius, 1775)
  - D. c. assatum (Giordani Soika, 1934)
  - D. c. campaniforme (Fabricius, 1775)
  - D. c. chloroticum Giordani Soika, 1979
  - D. c. pseudodyscherum (Bequaert, 1925)
  - D. c. pseudopulcherrimum Giordani Soika, 1968
  - D. c. rhodesiense Bequaert, 1926
  - D. c. tessmanni von Schulthess Rechberg, 1910
- Delta concinnum (de Saussure, 1855)
- Delta conoideum (Gmelin, 1790)
- Delta dimidiatipenne (Saussure, 1852)
- Delta emarginatum (Linnaeus, 1758)
- Delta esuriens (Fabricius, 1787)
  - Delta esuriens esuriens (Fabricius, 1787)
  - Delta esuriens gracile (Saussure, 1852)
- Delta fenestrale (Saussure, 1852)
- Delta guerini (de Saussure, 1852)
- Delta higletti (Meade-Waldo, 1910)
  - D. h. higletti (Meade-Waldo, 1910)
  - D. h. rendalli (Bingham, 1902)
- Delta hottentotta (de Saussure, 1852)
  - D. h. berlandi (Giordani Soika, 1934)
  - D. h. hottentottum (de Saussure, 1852)
  - D. h. nigriventre Giordani Soika, 1989
  - D. h. tibesticum (Giordani Soika, 19854)
  - D. h. unicoloripenne Giordani Soika, 1989
- Delta inexpectatum Giordani Soika, 1982
- Delta insulare (Smith, 1857)
- Delta latreillei (de Saussure, 1852)
- Delta lene (Bingham, 1897)
- Delta lepeleterii (de Saussure, 1852)
  - D. l. formosum (de Saussure, 1852)
  - D. l. lepeleterii (de Saussure, 1852)
  - D. l. meruense (Cameron, 1910)
  - D. l. pilosellum Giordani Soika, 1982
- Delta magnum van der Vecht, 1981
- Delta nigriculum Giordani Soika 1986
- Delta nigritarse (Meade-Waldo, 1910)
- Delta occidentale Giordani Soika, 1975
- Delta paraconicum Giordani Soika, 1972
- Delta philantes (de Saussure, 1852)
- Delta phthisicum (Gerstäcker, 1857)
- Delta pseudodimidiatipenne (Giordani Soika, 1944)
- Delta pulcherrimum (von Schulthess Rechberg, 1910)
  - D. p. nigrithorax Giordani Soika, 1982
  - D. p. pulcherrimum (von Schulthess Rechberg, 1910)
- Delta pyriforme (Fabricius, 1775)
  - D. p. circinale (Fabricius, 1804)
  - D. p. nigrocinctum Giordani Soika, 1993
  - D. p. philippinense (Bequaert, 1928)
  - D. p. pyriforme (Fabricius, 1775)
- Delta regina (de Saussure, 1852)
- Delta sakalavus (de Saussure, 1900)
- Delta sciarum (van der Vecht, 1959)
- Delta subfenestrale (Giordani Soika, 1939)
- Delta tropicale (de Saussure, 1852)
- Delta unguiculatum (Villers, 1789)
- Delta versicolor van der Vecht, 1981
- Delta viatrix (Nurse, 1903)
- Delta xanthura (de Saussure, 1852)
