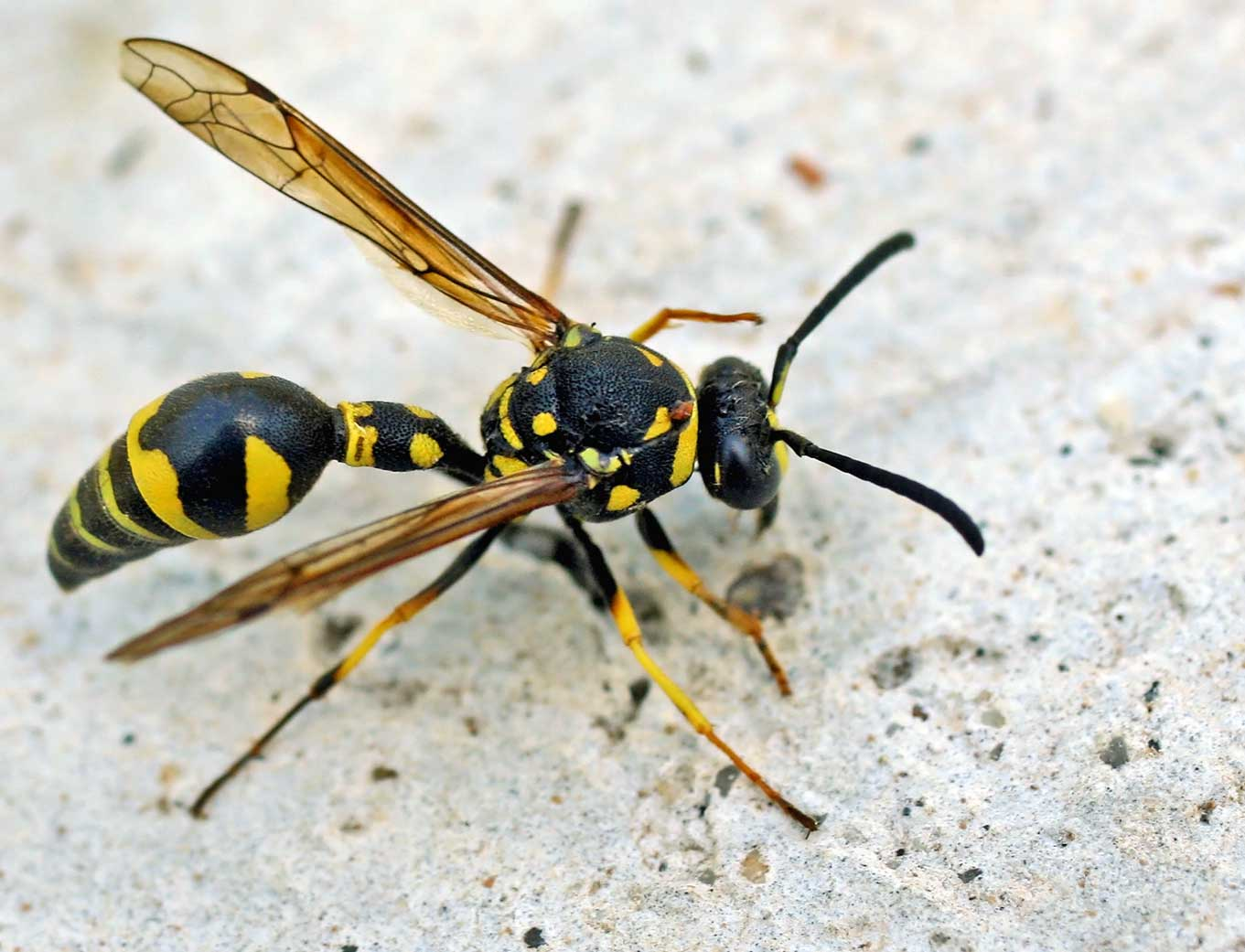
- Katamenes arbustorum

Scientific classification
- Kingdom: Animalia
- Phylum: Arthropoda
- Clade: Pancrustacea
- Class: Insecta
- Order: Hymenoptera
- Family: Vespidae
- Genus: Katamenes
- Species: K. arbustorum

Binomial name
- Katamenes arbustorum (Panzer, 1799)

Synonyms
- Eumenes arbustorum Panzer, 1799; Eumenes debeaumonti Giordani Soika 1949

= Katamenes arbustorum =

Species of wasp

Katamenes arbustorum is a species of potter wasp in the subfamily Eumeninae of the family Vespidae.

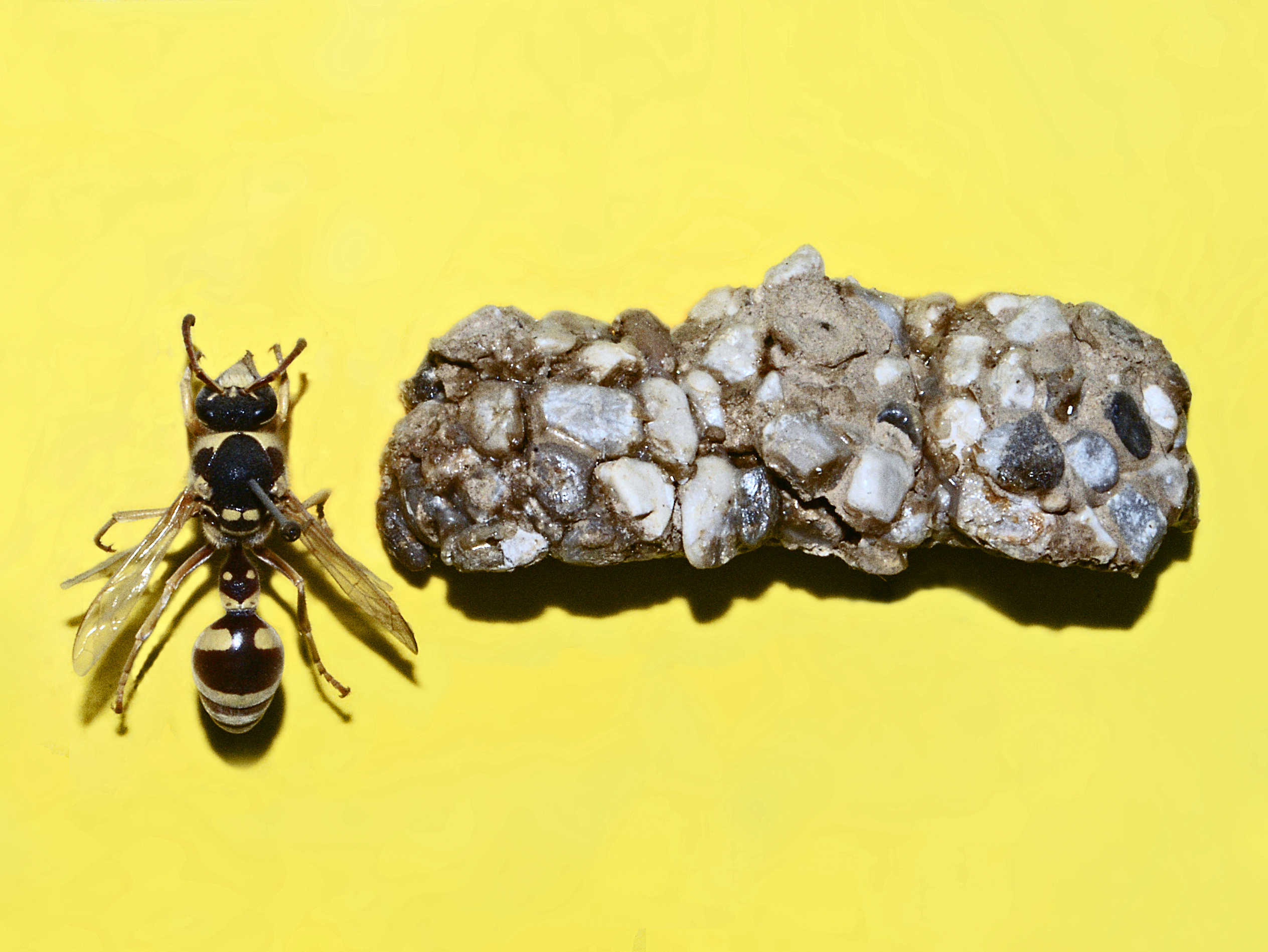
Museum specimen of Katamenes arbustorum with nest

== Subspecies ==
- Katamenes arbustorum arbustorum (Panzer 1799)
- Katamenes arbustorum burlini (Giordani Soika 1949)
- Katamenes arbustorum soikai Borsato 1993

== Description ==
Katamenes arbustorum can reach a length of 18–20 millimetres (0.71–0.79 in) in the females, of 15–18 millimetres (0.59–0.71 in) in the males. The body has a black and yellow pattern. Petiole and postpetiole are strongly divided.

== Biology ==
The flight time is from early June until the end of July. The females build their nests on rocks using small stones and clay. Katamenes arbustorum are parasitized by the chrysidid wasps Stilbum calens and Stilbum cyanurum.

== Distribution ==
This species is present is in North Africa, in southern Europe north to the southern valleys of the Alps.

== Bibliography ==
- Carpenter, J.M., J. Gusenleitner & M. Madl. 2010a. A Catalogue of the Eumeninae (Hymenoptera: Vespidae) of the Ethiopian Region excluding Malagasy Subregion. Part II: Genera Delta de Saussure 1885 to Zethus Fabricius 1804 and species incertae sedis. Linzer Biologischer Beitrage 42 (1): 95-315.
- Rolf Witt: Wespen. Beobachten, Bestimmen. Naturbuch-Verlag, Augsburg 1998, ISBN 3-89440-243-1.
- Antonio Giordani Soika (1958) Boll.Mus.Civ.Stor.nat.Venezia Notulae vespidologicae V. Biogeografia e sistematica del sottogenere Katemenes (M. W.), Volume: 11 Pages: 57-68
- Bisby F.A., Roskov Y.R., Orrell T.M., Nicolson D., Paglinawan L.E., Bailly N., Kirk P.M., Bourgoin T., Baillargeon G., Ouvrard D. (red.) (2011). Species 2000 & ITIS Catalogue of Life: 2011 Annual Checklist.. Species 2000: Reading, UK..
- ZOBODAT: Zoological-Botanical Database (Vespoidea). Gusenleitner J.
