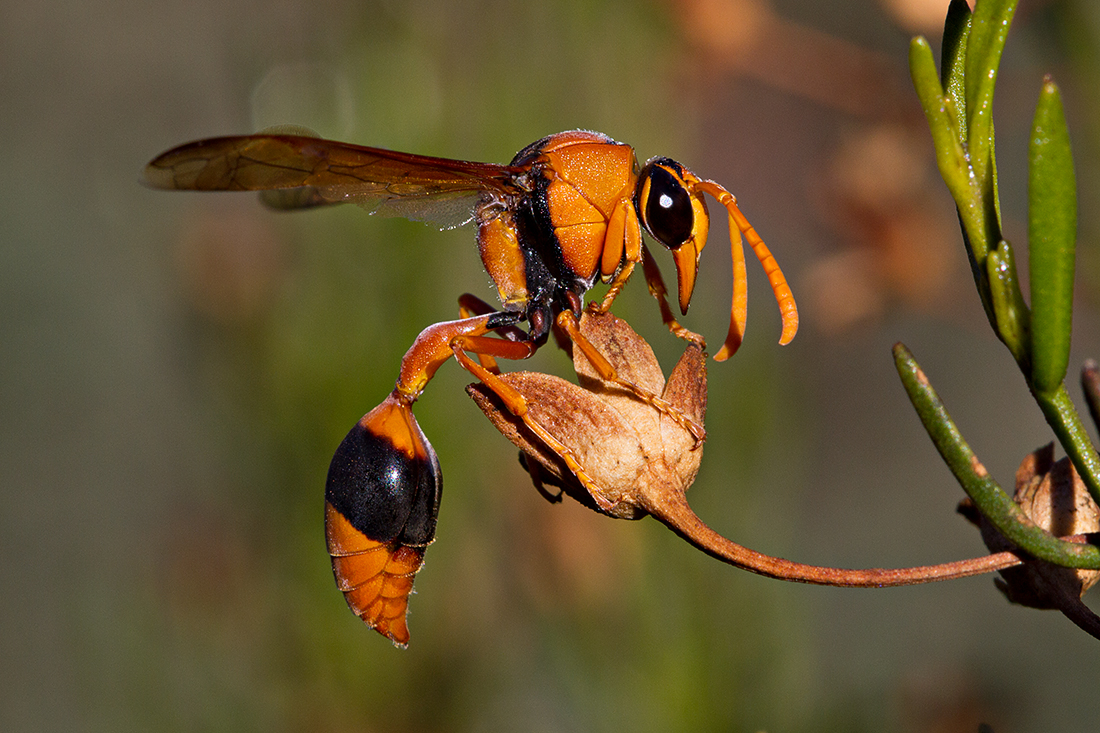

Scientific classification
- Domain: Eukaryota
- Kingdom: Animalia
- Phylum: Arthropoda
- Class: Insecta
- Order: Hymenoptera
- Family: Vespidae
- Genus: Delta
- Species: D. bicinctum

Binomial name
- Delta bicinctum de Saussure, 1852

= Delta bicinctum =

Species of wasp

Delta bicinctum is a species of potter wasp from Australia.
