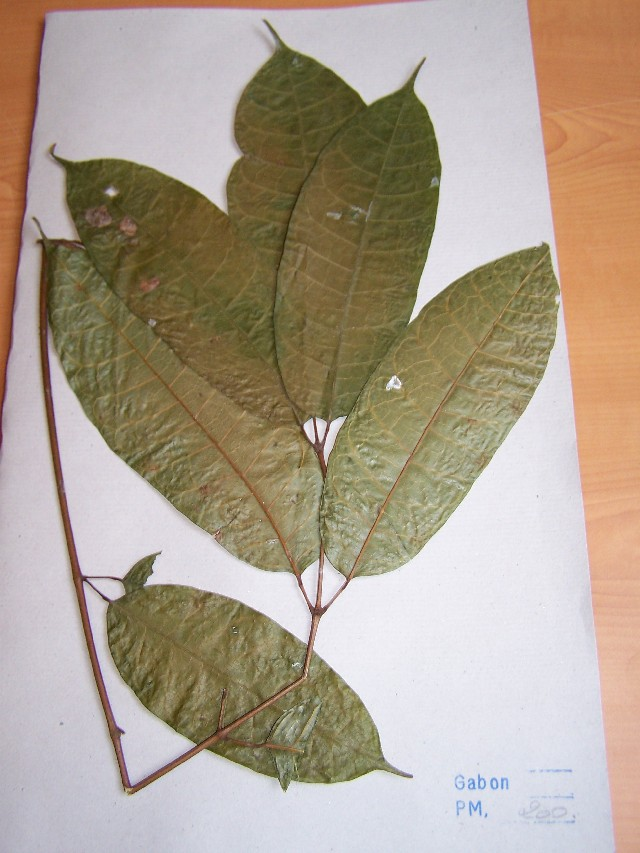

Conservation status
- Vulnerable (IUCN 2.3)

Scientific classification
- Kingdom: Plantae
- Clade: Tracheophytes
- Clade: Angiosperms
- Clade: Eudicots
- Clade: Rosids
- Order: Sapindales
- Family: Burseraceae
- Genus: Aucoumea; Pierre
- Species: A. klaineana

Binomial name
- Aucoumea klaineana Pierre

= Aucoumea =

Genus of trees

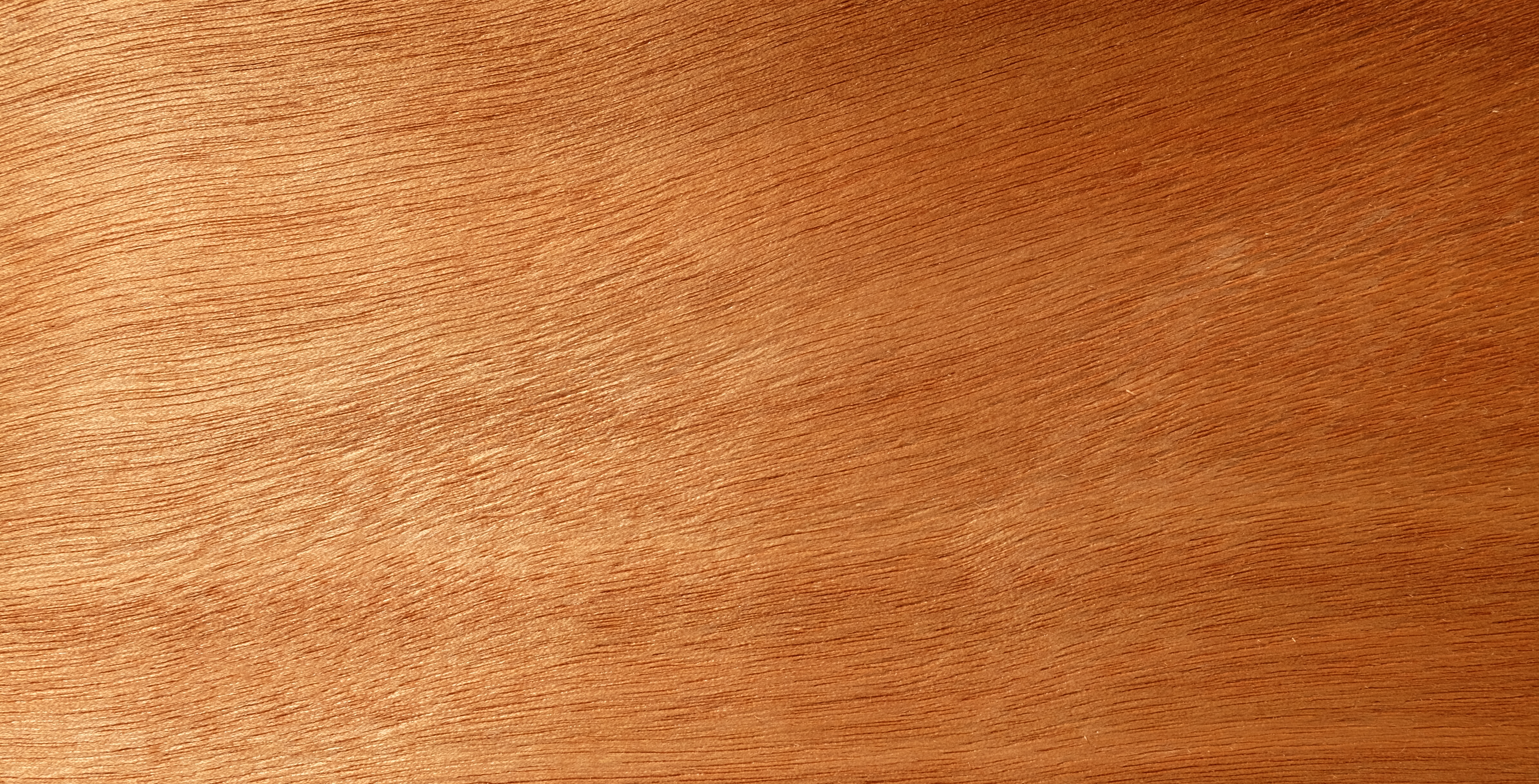
Okoumé

Aucoumea klaineana (angouma, gaboon, or okoumé) is a tree in the family Burseraceae, native to equatorial west Africa in Gabon, the Republic of the Congo, and Río Muni. It is the only species in the genus Aucoumea. It is a large hardwood tree growing to 30–40 m (100–130 feet) tall, rarely larger, with a trunk 1.0–2.5 m (3.5–8 feet) diameter above the often large basal buttresses. The tree generally grows in small stands, with the roots of the trees intertwined with neighboring trees. In Gabon, it is the primary timber species.

== Uses ==
It is a weak wood, with low decay resistance and moderate dimensional stability. The major use of gaboon is in the manufacture of plywood. It is about 8–12% lighter than the other main marine plywood, meranti, that is commonly used in boatbuilding, but is not as stiff. This is useful when a boat design calls for tight-radius bends, such as near the bow in a single chine design, because of its flexibility. However, it does not resist impact damage as well as meranti. It is often sheathed in epoxy resin to increase strength and give more impact and abrasion resistance, and to increase water resistance over conventional marine enamel paints. It is often used in sandwich construction with epoxy binder.

Its attractive appearance means that it is often used decoratively as the top surface veneer in panelling and furniture, or in solid form, in luxury items such as boxes for cigars or other high-value items (e.g. audio equipment).

Gaboon plywood is also used in the French aircraft industry to make light airplanes, such as those built by Avions Robin. It was used extensively to manufacture the Jodel range of aircraft, which are popular throughout Europe, but no longer factory-built. However, the wood's open grain, flexibility, and light weight make it a popular choice for amateur builders of Jodel aircraft to this day.

In the form known as okoumé marine-grade plywood, it is considered perhaps the finest construction plywood now available for boats, especially where lighter weight is needed. It is widely available manufactured and certified to British Standard 1088. Its users range from individual hobbyist kayak builders to some of the world's largest boat builders. Most often it is used in combination with epoxy and fiberglass, the combination giving a structure that can be stronger and lighter than plastic or fiberglass, rivaling the performance characteristics of more advanced composites such as carbon fiber. The grain appearance is prized, likened to that of mahogany, and is often varnished for a decorative appearance.

When used for the backs and sides of high-end acoustic guitars, okoumé (or as it is known in the trade, akoumé) exhibits many of the tonal properties of maple. Guitars made with okoumé are noticeably lighter in weight than those made with mahogany or rosewood.

The timber provides high chatoyance, with an average value above 21 PZC.
