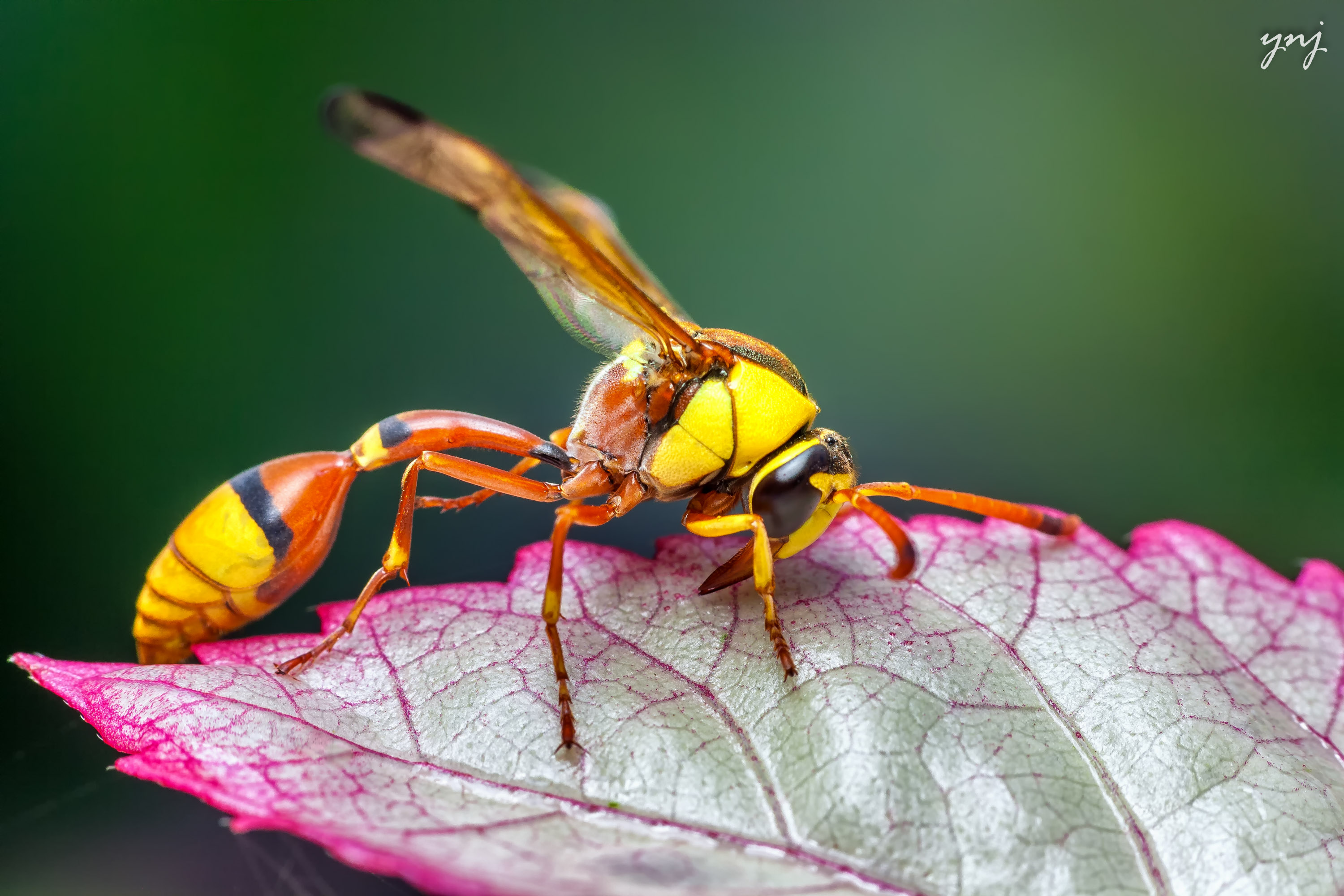

Scientific classification
- Kingdom: Animalia
- Phylum: Arthropoda
- Clade: Pancrustacea
- Class: Insecta
- Order: Hymenoptera
- Family: Vespidae
- Genus: Delta
- Species: D. esuriens

Binomial name
- Delta esuriens (Fabricius, 1787)

Synonyms
- Eumenes campaniformis esuriens

= Delta esuriens =

Species of wasp

Delta esuriens is a species of potter wasp found in tropical Asia, belonging to the Vespidae family. They can be separated from the similar looking Delta pyriforme by the presence of a yellow band on the metasomal petiole segment.

Female Delta esuriens build a nest of mud with 1-8 cells adjacent to each other in 1 or 2 rows with their entrance holes pot-like which are provisioned with lepidopteran caterpillars before an egg is laid and the entrance hole sealed. The egg hangs from the cell wall, suspended by a bit of silk. About 3 to 10 caterpillars may be placed in a single cell. The eggs hatch in a couple of days and feed for a week. Pupation takes about two weeks. Male offspring have a slightly shorter development time and emerge earlier. The adults emerge from the cells in about a month. The larvae are parasitized by Chrysididae and Bombyliidae and preyed on by Sarcophagidae and ants.
