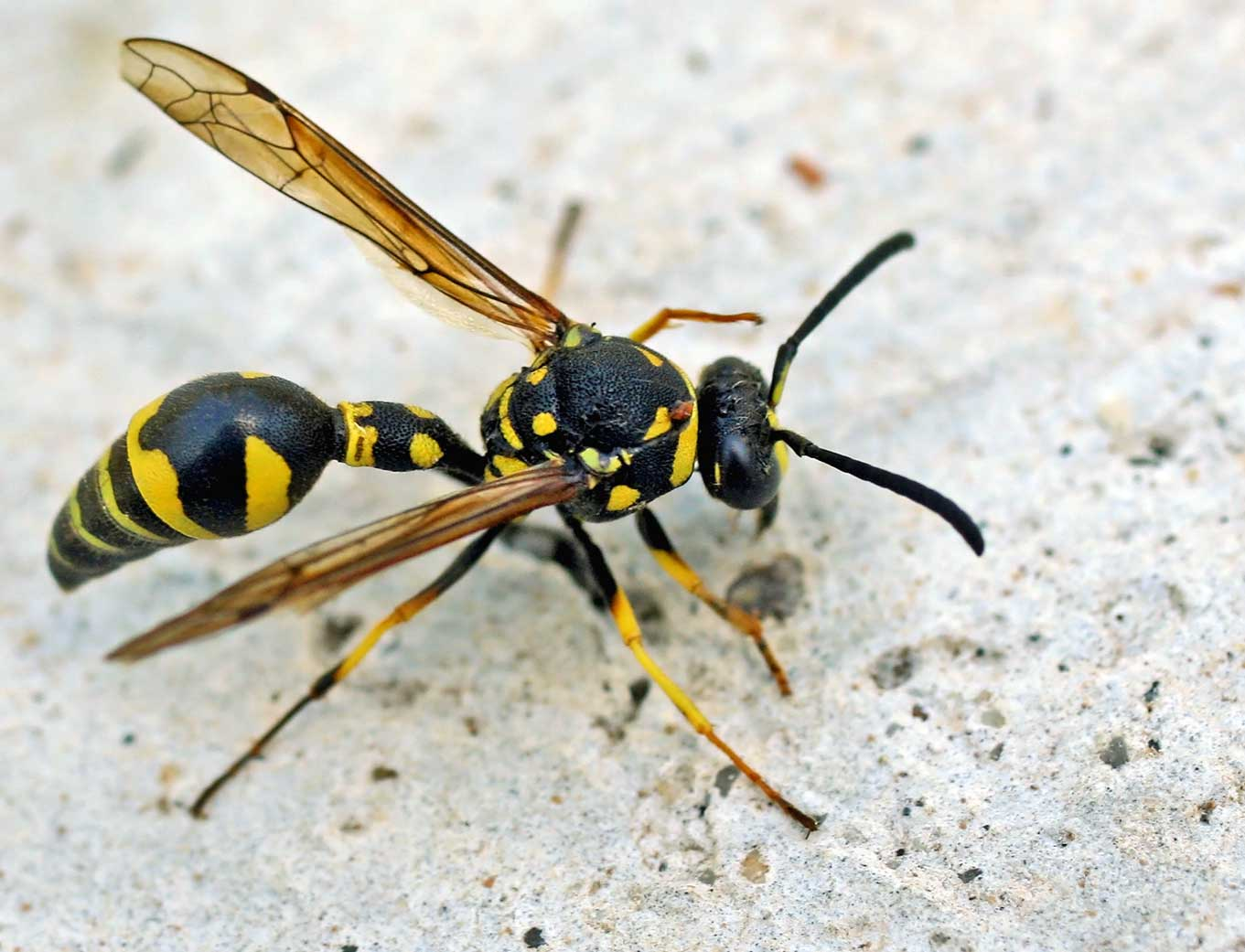
- Katamenes arbustorum

Scientific classification
- Domain: Eukaryota
- Kingdom: Animalia
- Phylum: Arthropoda
- Class: Insecta
- Order: Hymenoptera
- Family: Vespidae
- Subfamily: Eumeninae
- Genus: Katamenes; Meade-Waldo, 1910

Type species
- Katamenes watsoni Meade-Waldo, 1910

Species
- See text

= Katamenes =

Genus of wasps

Katamenes is a genus of potter wasps with species distributed in Europe and Africa. When originally named by Edmund Meade-Waldo, Katemenes was monotypic, containing only K. watsoni, but other species have since been moved from Eumenes to Katamenes.

== Species ==
The following species are currently recognised as being classified within Katamenes:

- Katamenes algirus (Schulz 1905)
- Katamenes arbustorum (Panzer 1799)
- Katamenes dimidiatus (Brullé 1832)
- Katamenes dimidiativentris (Giordani Soika, 1941)
- Katamenes flavigularis (Blüthgen 1951)
- Katamenes indetonsus (Moravitz, 1895)
- Katamenes jenjouristei (Kostylev, 1939)
- Katamenes kashmirensis (Giordani Soika, 1939)
- Katamenes libycus (Giordani Soika, 1941)
- Katamenes microcephalus (Saussure, 1852)
- Katamenes niger (Brullé, 1836)
- Katamenes priesneri (Giordani Soika, 1941)
- Katamenes radoszkovskii Blüthgen, 1962
- Katamenes rauensis Giordani Soika, 1958
- Katamenes sichelii (Saussure 1852)
- Katamenes tauricus (Saussure, 1855)
- Katamenes watsoni Meade-Waldo, 1910
