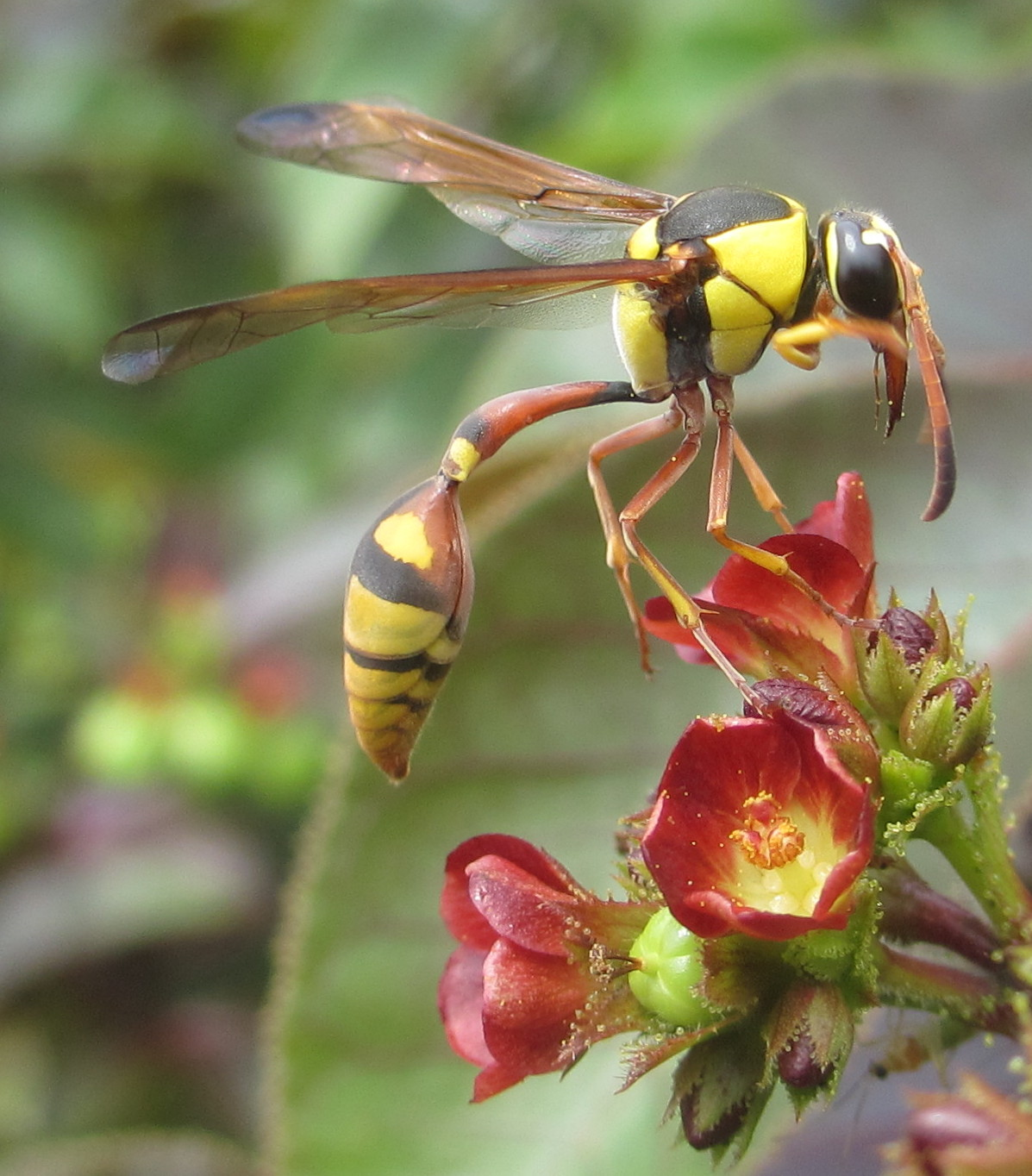

Scientific classification
- Domain: Eukaryota
- Kingdom: Animalia
- Phylum: Arthropoda
- Class: Insecta
- Order: Hymenoptera
- Family: Vespidae
- Genus: Delta
- Species: D. lepeleterii

Binomial name
- Delta lepeleterii (de Saussure, 1852)

Synonyms
- Eumenes lepeleterii de Saussure, 1852

= Delta lepeleterii =

Species of wasp

Delta lepeleterii is a species of potter wasp from Angola, Botswana, Burkina Faso, Democratic Republic of Congo, Eritrea, Ethiopia, Kenya, Mali, Mozambique, Namibia, Niger, Nigeria, Senegal, Socotra, Somalia, South Africa, Sudan, Tanzania (Tanzania, Zanzibar).
