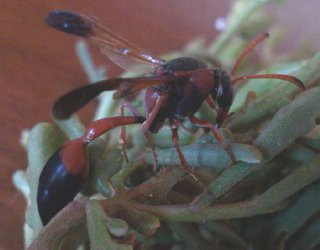

Scientific classification
- Kingdom: Animalia
- Phylum: Arthropoda
- Clade: Pancrustacea
- Class: Insecta
- Order: Hymenoptera
- Family: Vespidae
- Genus: Delta
- Species: D. dimidiatipenne

Binomial name
- Delta dimidiatipenne (Saussure, 1852)

Synonyms
- Delta emarginatus dimidiatipennis; Eumenes transcaspicus Morawitz, 1895; Eumenes maxillosus dimidiatipennis; Eumenes dimidiatipennis de Saussure, 1852

= Delta dimidiatipenne =

Species of wasp

Delta dimidiatipenne is a species of large, red-coloured potter wasp in the genus Delta that exists in the warmer regions of the Palearctic. Like many other potter wasps, it is a provisioning species that hunts caterpillars.

== Description ==
Delta dimidiatipenne has a dull reddish head, with black markings which extend from behind the eyes over the top of its head to the back of the neck. The thorax is mainly black, apart for red patches on the second segment and on the upper parts of the third and last segments. A narrow "waist", typical of this type of solitary wasp is created by the fusing together of the thorax and the first segment of the abdomen. The abdomen is mostly black, except for a red band just beyond the waist. The wings are rusty-coloured with grey-brown tips, and may show a purplish tinge. The antennae normally have black tips. Both sexes are similar, but the male is slightly smaller and slenderer with a yellow blotch on his face. Females measure 20–23 mm in body length whilst males can be slightly shorter at 19–22 mm.

== Biology ==
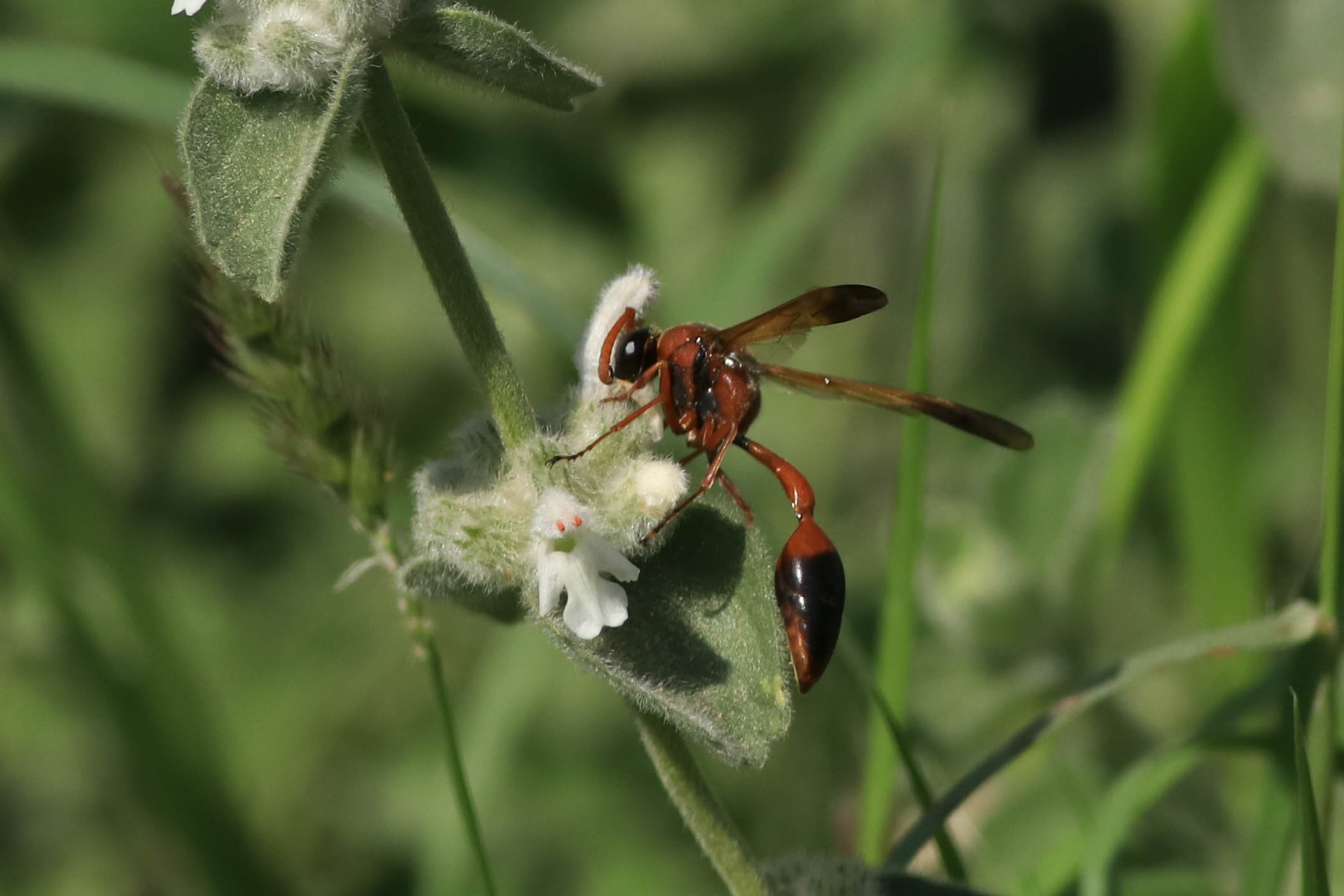
Red potter wasp from United Arab Emirates

Potter wasps are so named for their characteristic nest building behaviour. The female constructs a mud nest, often attached to a wall or rocks, by mixing sand or mud with saliva and mould it into a pot-shaped vessel with her mouthparts. The opening has a lip and usually hangs downward. When the mud has dried out and hardened, a single egg is laid inside and suspended from the roof by a thread of silk. The nest is provisioned with several caterpillars, which the larva eats during its development inside the chamber. The adults, like other solitary wasps, feed on nectar, including that of Acacia flowers.

== Distribution ==
Delta dimidiatipenne is a widespread species which extends from Morocco through north Africa to Egypt and Somalia, throughout the Middle East, and east to India and Nepal. It was introduced to the Canary Islands in 1988 and is now widespread in the archipelago.

== Habitat ==
Delta dimidiatipenne is regarded as a desert species but can be seen in gardens in eastern Arabia.

== Gallery ==
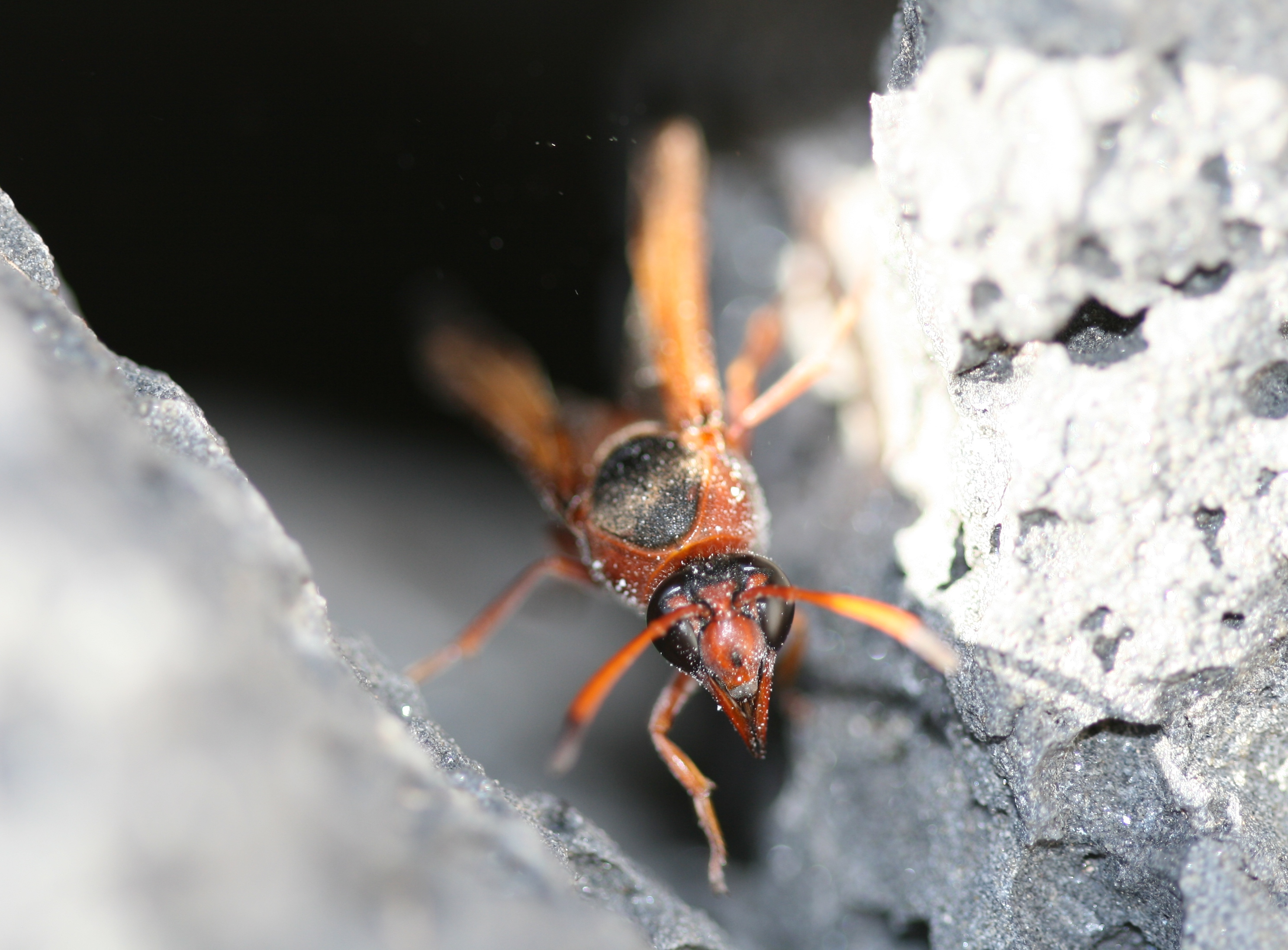
D. dimidiatipenne building a nest on Lanzarote, Canary Islands

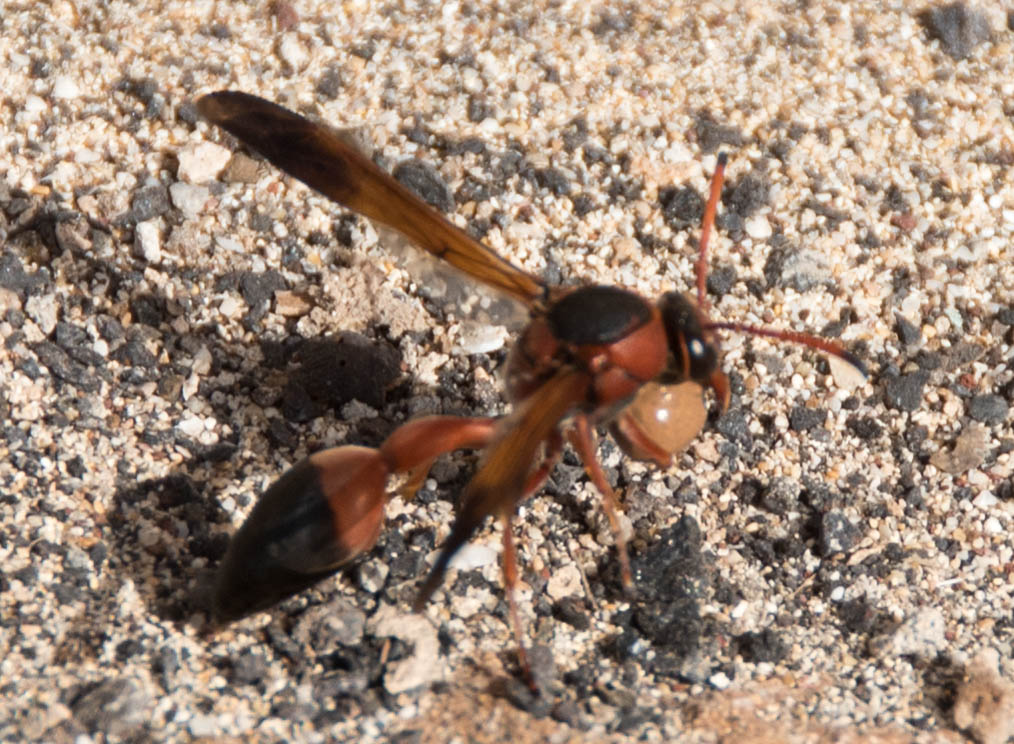
D. dimidiatipenne preparing provisions for her nest on Lanzarote, Canary Islands

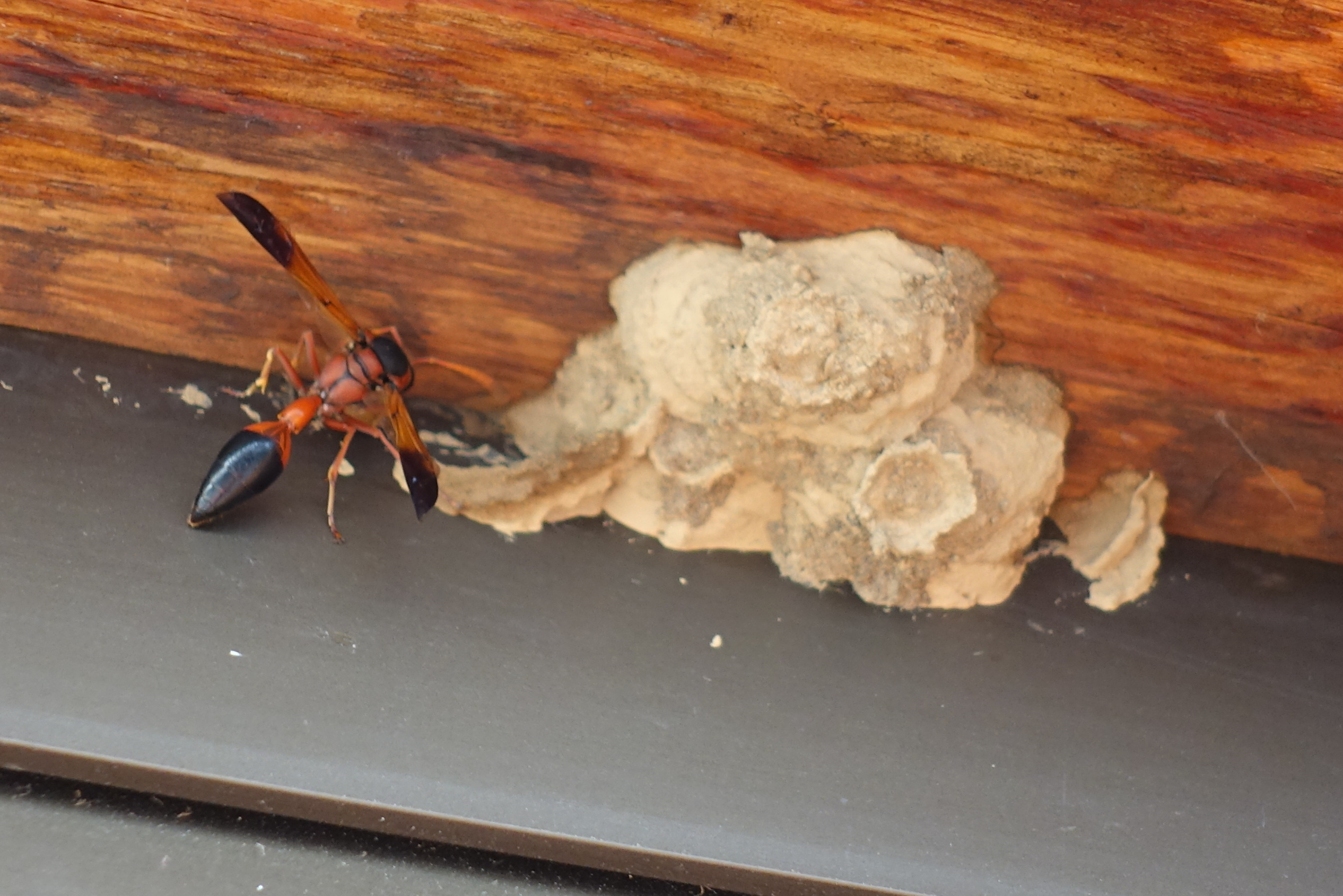
D. dimidiatipenne building a nest on El Hierro, Canary Islands

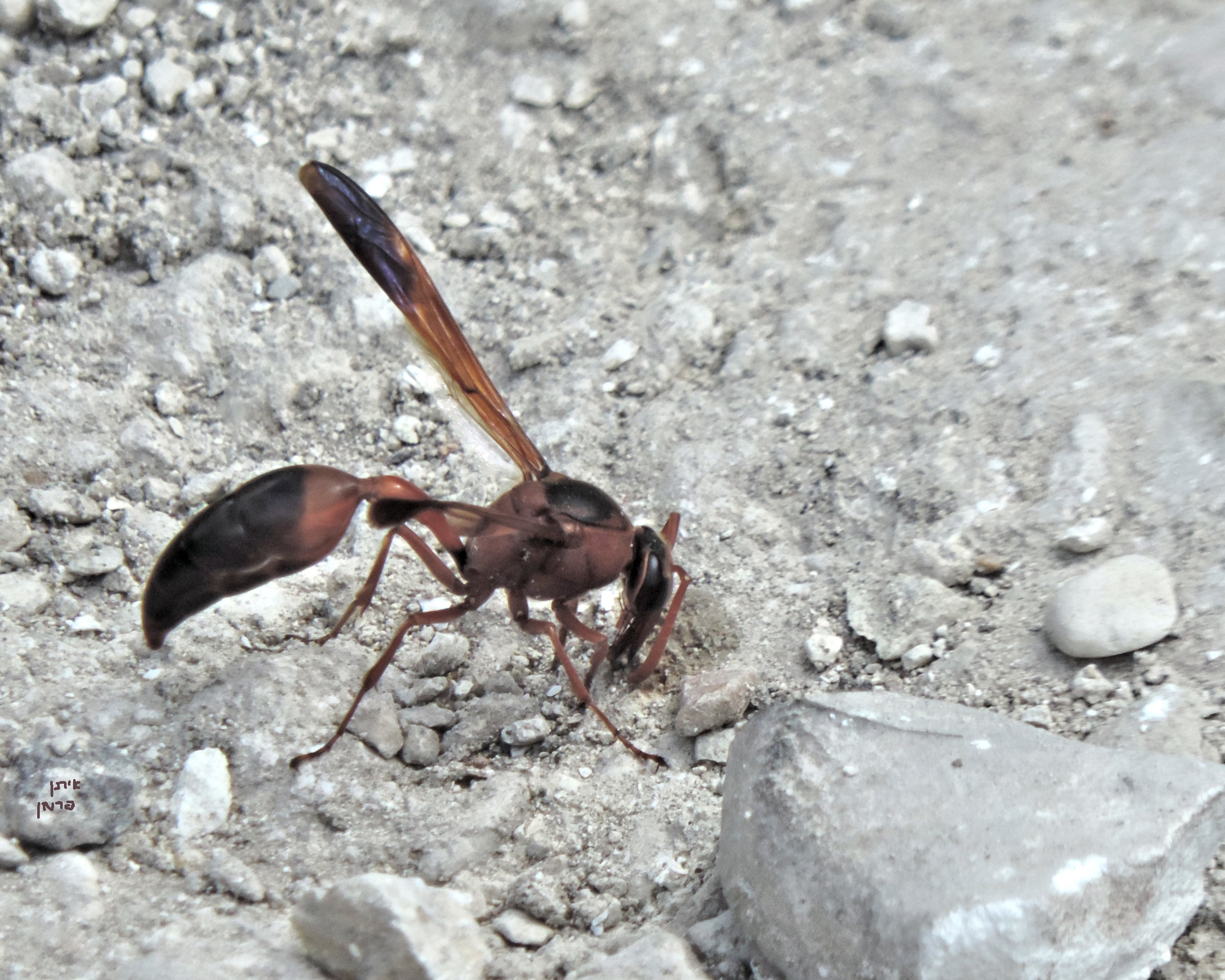
D. dimidiatipenne collecting sand near Yoqne-am, Israel
