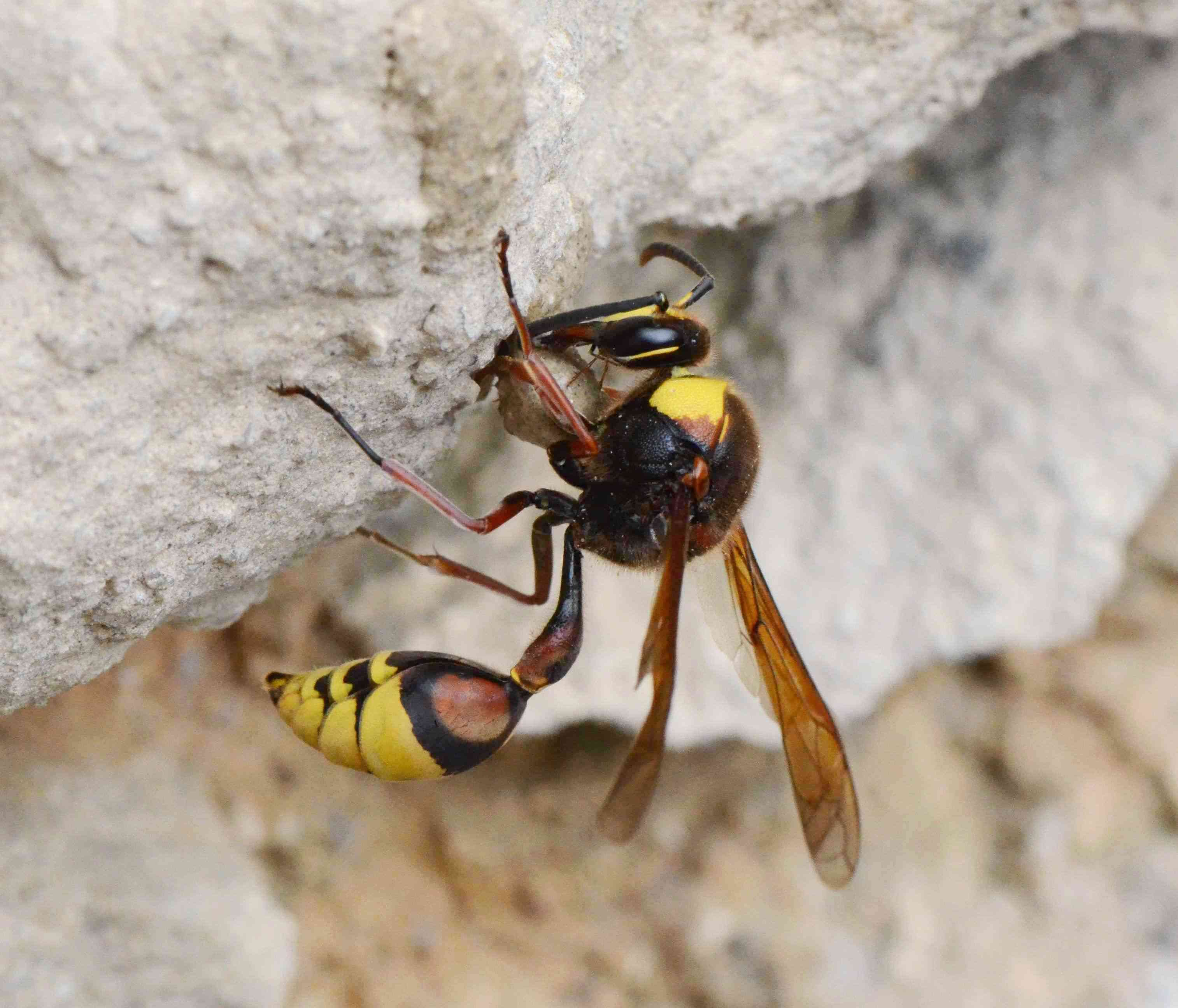

Scientific classification
- Domain: Eukaryota
- Kingdom: Animalia
- Phylum: Arthropoda
- Class: Insecta
- Order: Hymenoptera
- Family: Vespidae
- Genus: Delta
- Species: D. unguiculatum

Binomial name
- Delta unguiculatum (Villers, 1789)

= Delta unguiculatum =

Species of wasp

Delta unguiculatum is a species of potter wasp from Europe and Africa.
