= BS 1088 =

In materials, BS 1088 is the British Standard specification for marine plywood that applies to plywood produced with untreated tropical hardwood veneers that have a set level of resistance to fungal attack. The plies are bonded with Weather Boil Proof (WBP) glue.

Although this is a British Standard, the finished product does not have to be made in Britain, just manufactured to meet the standard. The standard is associated with Lloyd's Register since it performs testing of products to this standard. It does not follow that it is a structural plywood.

WBP Glue Line – BS 1088 plywood must use an adhesive, which has been proven to be highly resistant to weather, micro-organisms, cold and boiling water, steam and dry heat. The product's bonding must pass a series of British Standard tests.

Face Veneers – These must present a solid surface that is free from open defects. Face veneers must be free of knots other than "sound pin" knots, of which there shall be no more than six(6) in any area of one(1) square foot, and there can be no more than an Average of two(2) such knots per square foot area over the entire surface of the plywood sheet. The veneers must be reasonably free from irregular grain. The use of edge joints is limited, and end joints are not allowed.

Core Veneers – Core veneers have the same basic requirements as face veneers, except that small splits are allowed, and there is no limit on the number of pin knots or edge joints. However, end joints are not permitted.

Limits of Manufacturing Defects – Defective bonds, pleats and overlaps, and gaps in faces are not permitted. Occasional gaps may be repaired using veneer inserts bonded with the proper adhesive.

Moisture Content – BS 1088 plywood must have a moisture content between 6% and 14% when it leaves the factory.

Finishing – Boards will be sanded on both sides equally.

Length & Width – The length or width of a board produced as a standard size shall not be less than the specified size nor more than 6.3 mm (0.25 in) greater than the specified size.

Squareness – The lengths of the diagonals of a board shall not differ by more than 0.25% of the length of the diagonal.

Thickness Tolerances – Tolerances vary as follows.

- 4 mm +.02/-0.6; 6 mm +.04/-0.65; 9 mm +.06/-0.75; 12 mm +.09/-0.82
- 15 mm +.1/-0.9; 18 mm +.12/-0.98; 22 mm +.16/-1.08; 25 mm +1.8/-1.16

From the above we can assume that 6 mm material will arrive at thickness' between 6.04 mm and 5.35 mm.

Face Veneer thickness – For any three-ply construction, which applies to 3 and 4 mm material, each face veneer shall be not thinner than 1/8 of the total thickness of veneers assembled dry. Since the dry thicknesses of the boards are 3.6 and 4.6 respectively, we can assume that, for these thicknesses only, the face veneers will be as follows:

- 3.6 mm dry x 12.5% (1/8) = 0.45 mm 4.6 mm dry x 12.5% (1/8) = 0.575 mm

Multi-Ply Construction-- This applies to boards thicker than 4.8 mm (3/16 in)

- Each face veneer shall be a minimum of 1.3 mm and not thicker than 3.8 mm.
- Each core veneer shall be no thicker than 4.8 mm

== See also ==
- Marine plywood
