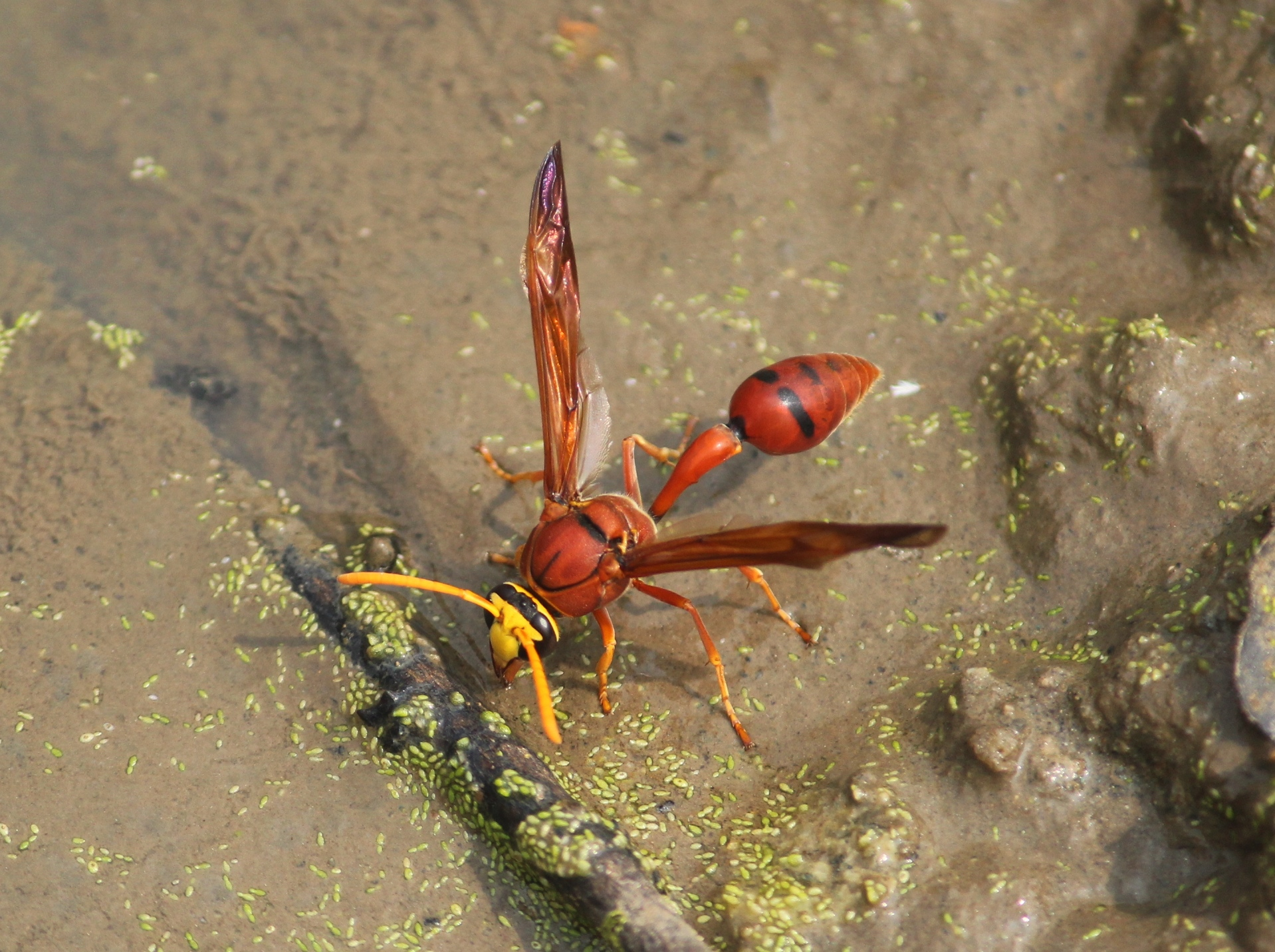
- Delta conoideum from south India

Scientific classification
- Kingdom: Animalia
- Phylum: Arthropoda
- Clade: Pancrustacea
- Class: Insecta
- Order: Hymenoptera
- Family: Vespidae
- Genus: Delta
- Species: D. conoideum

Binomial name
- Delta conoideum (Gmelin, 1790)

Synonyms
- Vespa conica Fabricius, 1787 (Homonym); Eumenes conica (Fabricius, 1787)

= Delta conoideum =

Species of wasp

Delta conoideum, the mason wasp, is a species of potter wasp in the subfamily Eumeninae of the family Vespidae.

== Distribution ==
This species can be found in India, Nepal, the Philippines, Indonesia, Sri Lanka, Thailand and Cambodia. Peptides in their venom have been studied by getting them to sting a block of agar.
