= Dabchick (dinghy) =

1955 sailing dinghy class

Boat
- Crew: 1

Hull
- Hull weight: 38.6 kilograms (85 lb)
- LOA: 3.607 metres (11 ft 10.0 in)
- Beam: 1.150 metres (3 ft 9.3 in)

Sails
- Upwind sail area: 5.57 square metres (60.0 sq ft)

The Dabchick is a South African youth sailing dinghy that is raced two up or single-handed. A Bermuda rigged boat, it has a mainsail and jib. Its hull is very shallow and its skipper sits on its flat deck. This hard chined scow was designed by Jack Köper in 1955. Since they were published in 1956, nearly 3,500 plans have been issued to builders, and over 4,000 boats have been built. It is usually sailed by young crew with teenager skipper instead of the Optimist, before moving into higher performance classes.

== Design and construction ==
For decades, Dabchicks all were built of marine plywood. Though fiberglass boats are now being built, dozens of wooden boats are still being sailed competitively. At the 2007 AGM, the class rules were modified to allow Mylar sails with a full-length top batten.
