= List of Parancistrocerus species =

These 111 species belong to Parancistrocerus, a genus of potter and mason wasps in the family Vespidae.

== Parancistrocerus species ==
- Parancistrocerus acarigaster (Bohart, 1952)^{c g}
- Parancistrocerus acarophilus Giordani Soika, 1995^{c g}
- Parancistrocerus acarophorus (Bohart, 1952)^{c g}
- Parancistrocerus acclivus Gusenleitner 2007^{c g}
- Parancistrocerus algidus (Schrottky, 1909)^{c g}
- Parancistrocerus androcles (Meade-Waldo, 1910)^{c g}
- Parancistrocerus areatus (Fox, 1902)^{c g}
- Parancistrocerus assamensis (Meade-Waldo, 1910)^{c g}
- Parancistrocerus assumptionis (Brethes, 1906)^{c g}
- Parancistrocerus atkinsi Bequard & Salt, 1931^{c g}
- Parancistrocerus austrinus (Cresson, 1872)^{c g}
- Parancistrocerus bacu (de Saussure, 1852)^{c g}
- Parancistrocerus bacuensis (de Saussure, 1852)^{c g}
- Parancistrocerus bicornis (Roberts, 1901)^{c g b}
- Parancistrocerus binotatus (Fabricius, 1804)^{c g}
- Parancistrocerus bonariensis (Brethes, 1906)^{c g}
- Parancistrocerus bravo (de Saussure, 1857)^{c g}
- Parancistrocerus capocacciai Giordani Soika, 1995^{c g}
- Parancistrocerus chiricahuae (Bohart, 1949)^{c g}
- Parancistrocerus citropictus Giordani Soika, 1995^{c g}
- Parancistrocerus concavus (Brethes, 1906)^{c g}
- Parancistrocerus coronado (Bohart, 1949)^{c g}
- Parancistrocerus cotti (Bohart, 1952)^{c g}
- Parancistrocerus cucullatus (Zavattari, 1912)^{c g}
- Parancistrocerus cylindricus (de Saussure, 1862)^{c g}
- Parancistrocerus cylindroides Giordani Soika, 1995^{c g}
- Parancistrocerus declivatus (Bohart, 1948)^{c g b}
- Parancistrocerus declivus (Brethes, 1903)^{c g}
- Parancistrocerus decollatus (Zavattari, 1912)^{c g}
- Parancistrocerus dejectus (Cresson, 1865)^{c g}
- Parancistrocerus difformis Giordani Soika, 1995^{c g}
- Parancistrocerus dorsonotatus (Fox, 1902)^{c g}
- Parancistrocerus dux (Zavattari, 1912)^{c g}
- Parancistrocerus enyo (Lepeletier, 1841)^{c}
- Parancistrocerus farias (de Saussure, 1857)^{c g}
- Parancistrocerus feai Giordani Soika, 1995^{c g}
- Parancistrocerus foveolatus (Brethes, 1906)^{c g}
- Parancistrocerus fulvipes (de Saussure, 1856)^{c g b}
- Parancistrocerus gracilior Giordani Soika, 1995^{c g}
- Parancistrocerus guzmani (de Saussure, 1857)^{c g}
- Parancistrocerus herbertii (Fox, 1902)^{c g}
- Parancistrocerus histrio (Lepeletier, 1841)^{c g b}
- Parancistrocerus holmbergi (Brethes, 1906)^{c}
- Parancistrocerus holmbergii (Brèthes 1906)^{c g}
- Parancistrocerus holzschuhi Gusenleitner, 1987^{c g}
- Parancistrocerus hongkongensis Gusenleitner, 2002^{c g}
- Parancistrocerus ignotus Giordani Soika, 1995^{c g}
- Parancistrocerus incommodus (de Saussure, 1852)^{c g}
- Parancistrocerus inconstans (de Saussure)^{c g}
- Parancistrocerus incorruptus Giordani Soika, 1972^{c g}
- Parancistrocerus inflaticeps Giordani Soika, 1995^{c g}
- Parancistrocerus inornatus (Zavattari, 1912)^{c}
- Parancistrocerus intermediatus (Sonan 1939)^{c}
- Parancistrocerus invisibilis (Zavattari, 1912)^{c g}
- Parancistrocerus irritatus Giordani Soika, 1972^{c g}
- Parancistrocerus kennethianus Giordani Soika, 1995^{c g}
- Parancistrocerus kolambuganensis Schulthess, 1934^{c g}
- Parancistrocerus kuraruensis (Sonan 1939)^{c}
- Parancistrocerus leionotus (Viereck, 1906)^{c g b}
- Parancistrocerus longicornutus (Dalla Torre, 1904)^{c g}
- Parancistrocerus lutzi Bequard & Salt, 1931^{c g}
- Parancistrocerus luzonicola Vecht, 1981^{c g}
- Parancistrocerus lynchii (Brethes, 1903)^{c g}
- Parancistrocerus macfarlandi (Cameron, 1909)^{c g}
- Parancistrocerus makilingi Giordani Soika, 1995^{c g}
- Parancistrocerus malayanus Giordani Soika, 1995^{c g}
- Parancistrocerus mcclayi (Bohart, 1952)^{c g}
- Parancistrocerus microsynoeca (Schrottky, 1909)^{c g}
- Parancistrocerus minimoferus (Bohart, 1949)^{c g b}
- Parancistrocerus nigriventris Giordani Soika, 1995^{c g}
- Parancistrocerus nitobei (Sonan, 1939)^{c g}
- Parancistrocerus obliquus (Cresson, 1865)^{c g}
- Parancistrocerus olseni Bequard & Salt, 1931^{c g}
- Parancistrocerus parapedestris (Bohart, 1952)^{c g}
- Parancistrocerus paulensis (Zavattari, 1912)^{c g}
- Parancistrocerus pedestris (de Saussure, 1856)^{c g b}
- Parancistrocerus pensylvanicus (de Saussure, 1856)^{c g b}
- Parancistrocerus perennis (de Saussure, 1857)^{c g b}
- Parancistrocerus polingi (Bohart, 1949)^{c g}
- Parancistrocerus productus (Smith, 1862)^{c g}
- Parancistrocerus pruinosus (Smith, 1857)^{c g}
- Parancistrocerus pseudallodynerus Giordani Soika, 1995^{c g}
- Parancistrocerus pseudodynerus (Dalla Torre, 1889)^{c g}
- Parancistrocerus rectangulis (Viereck, 1908)^{c g}
- Parancistrocerus rhipheus (Cameron, 1904)^{c g}
- Parancistrocerus robertianus (Cameron)^{c g}
- Parancistrocerus saecularis (de Saussure, 1852)^{c g}
- Parancistrocerus salcularis ^{b}
- Parancistrocerus saltensis (Brethes, 1906)^{c g}
- Parancistrocerus samarensis (Schulthess, 1934)^{c g}
- Parancistrocerus scapultatus (Zavattari, 1912)^{c g}
- Parancistrocerus siamensis Gusenleitner, 2003^{c g}
- Parancistrocerus siccus (Bohart, 1952)^{c g}
- Parancistrocerus striatus (Fox, 1902)^{c g}
- Parancistrocerus subcyaneus (Brèthes, 1909)^{c g}
- Parancistrocerus subtoltecus (Viereck, 1906)^{c g}
- Parancistrocerus sulcatus Giordani Soika, 1995^{c g}
- Parancistrocerus sumichrasti (de Saussure, 1857)^{c g}
- Parancistrocerus taihorinensis (Schulthess, 1934)^{c g}
- Parancistrocerus taihorinshoensis (Schulthess, 1934)^{c g}
- Parancistrocerus taikonus (Sonan 1939)^{c g}
- Parancistrocerus texensis Saussure, 1871^{c g b}
- Parancistrocerus toltecus (de Saussure, 1857)^{c b}
- Parancistrocerus trepidus (Zavattari, 1912)^{c g}
- Parancistrocerus triconcavus Giordani Soika, 1995^{c g}
- Parancistrocerus ussuriensis Kurzenko, 1981^{c g}
- Parancistrocerus vagus (de Saussure, 1857)^{c g b}
- Parancistrocerus vicinus Giordani Soika, 1995^{c g}
- Parancistrocerus vogti Kromb., 1962^{c g}
- Parancistrocerus yachowensis Giordani Soika, 1986^{c g}
- Parancistrocerus yamanei Gusenleitner, 2000^{c g}

Data sources: i = ITIS, c = Catalogue of Life, g = GBIF, b = Bugguide.net
