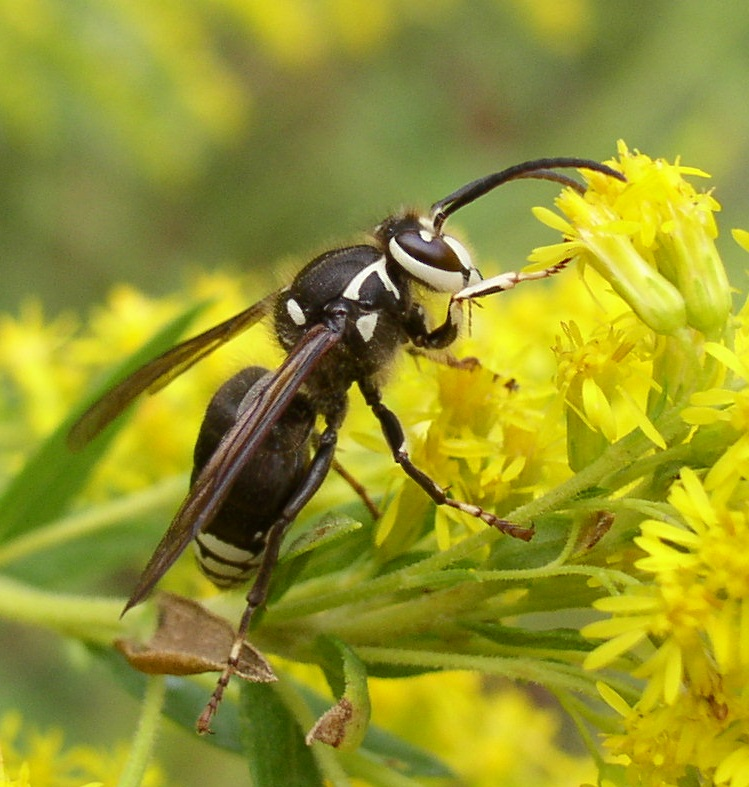
- Dolichovespula maculata, bald-faced hornet

Scientific classification
- Kingdom: Animalia
- Phylum: Arthropoda
- Clade: Pancrustacea
- Class: Insecta
- Order: Hymenoptera
- Infraorder: Aculeata
- Superfamily: Vespoidea

Families
- See text

= Vespoidea =

Superfamily of insects

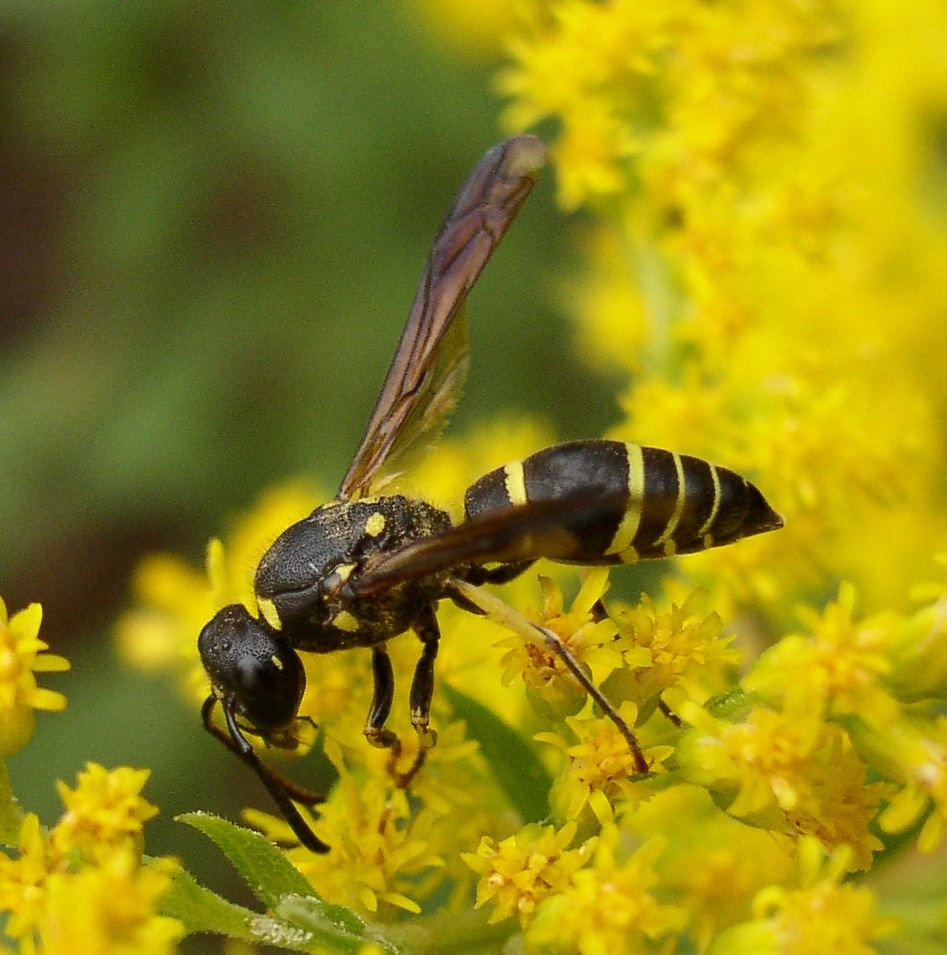
Ancistrocerus antilope female. Family Vespidae

Vespoidea is a superfamily of wasps in the order Hymenoptera. Vespoidea includes wasps with a large variety of lifestyles including eusocial, social, and solitary habits, predators, scavengers, parasitoids, and some herbivores.

== Description ==
Vespoid wasp females have antennae with 10 flagellomeres, while males have 11 flagellomeres. The edge of the pronotum reaches or passes the tegula. Many species display some level of sexual dimorphism. Most species have fully developed wings, but some have reduced or absent wings in one or both sexes. As in other Aculeata, only the females are ever capable of stinging.

== Phylogenetics and taxonomy ==
Research based on four nuclear genes (elongation factor-1α F2 copy, long-wavelength rhodopsin, wingless and the D2–D3 regions of 28S ribosomal RNA—2700 bp in total) suggests the historical view of family relationships need to be changed, with Rhopalosomatidae as a sister group of the Vespidae and the clade Rhopalosomatidae + Vespidae as sister to all other classical vespoids and apoids. In a study in 2008, the superfamily Apoidea was found to nest within the Vespoidea, suggesting the dismantling of Vespoidea (sensu lato) into many smaller superfamilies: Formicoidea, Scolioidea, Tiphioidea, Thynnoidea, and Pompiloidea in addition to a much more narrowly defined Vespoidea (restricted to Rhopalosomatidae and Vespidae). Their research also found families Mutillidae, Tiphiidae, and Bradynobaenidae to be paraphyletic.

A later study in 2013 confirmed the need for revision of high-level relationships, and the pattern of sister-group relationships within the putative Vespoidea largely matched the same basic pattern as the 2008 study. This study also noted a paraphyletic Bradynobaenidae and Tiphiidae.

The extinct family of Armaniidae also was formerly considered to be a group of "ant-like wasps" and was also classified under Vespoidea. However, additional work by Borysenko in 2017 found these species to be basal members of Formicidae, placing three genera under Sphecomyrminae and considering the rest incertae sedis.

=== Families retained in Vespoidea ===
- Rhopalosomatidae – rhopalosomatid wasps
- Vespidae – paper wasps, hornets, potter wasps, yellow jackets, and relatives

=== Families represented by Formicoidea ===
- Formicidae - ants

=== Families represented by Pompiloidea ===
- Mutillidae – velvet ants/velvet wasps
- Myrmosidae – myrmosid wasps
- Pompilidae – spider wasps
- Sapygidae – sapygid wasps

=== Families represented by Scolioidea ===
- Scoliidae – scoliid wasps

=== Families represented by Tiphioidea ===
- Bradynobaenidae – bradynobaenid wasps
- Sierolomorphidae – sierolomorphid wasps
- Tiphiidae – tiphiid wasps

=== Families represented by Thynnoidea ===
- Chyphotidae – chyphotid wasps
- Thynnidae – thynnid wasps
