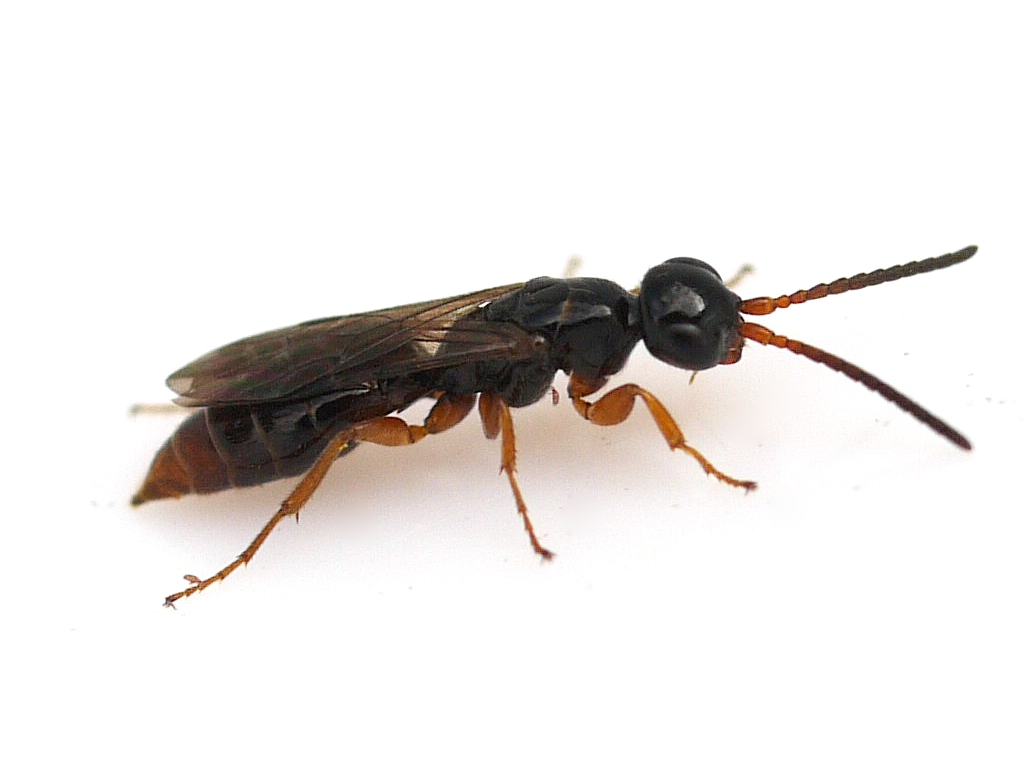
- Sierolomorpha canadensis

Scientific classification
- Kingdom: Animalia
- Phylum: Arthropoda
- Clade: Pancrustacea
- Class: Insecta
- Order: Hymenoptera
- Infraorder: Aculeata
- Superfamily: Tiphioidea

= Tiphioidea =

Superfamily of wasps

Tiphioidea is a suggested superfamily of stinging wasps in the order Hymenoptera. There are three families in Tiphioidea, Bradynobaenidae, Tiphiidae, and Sierolomorphidae.

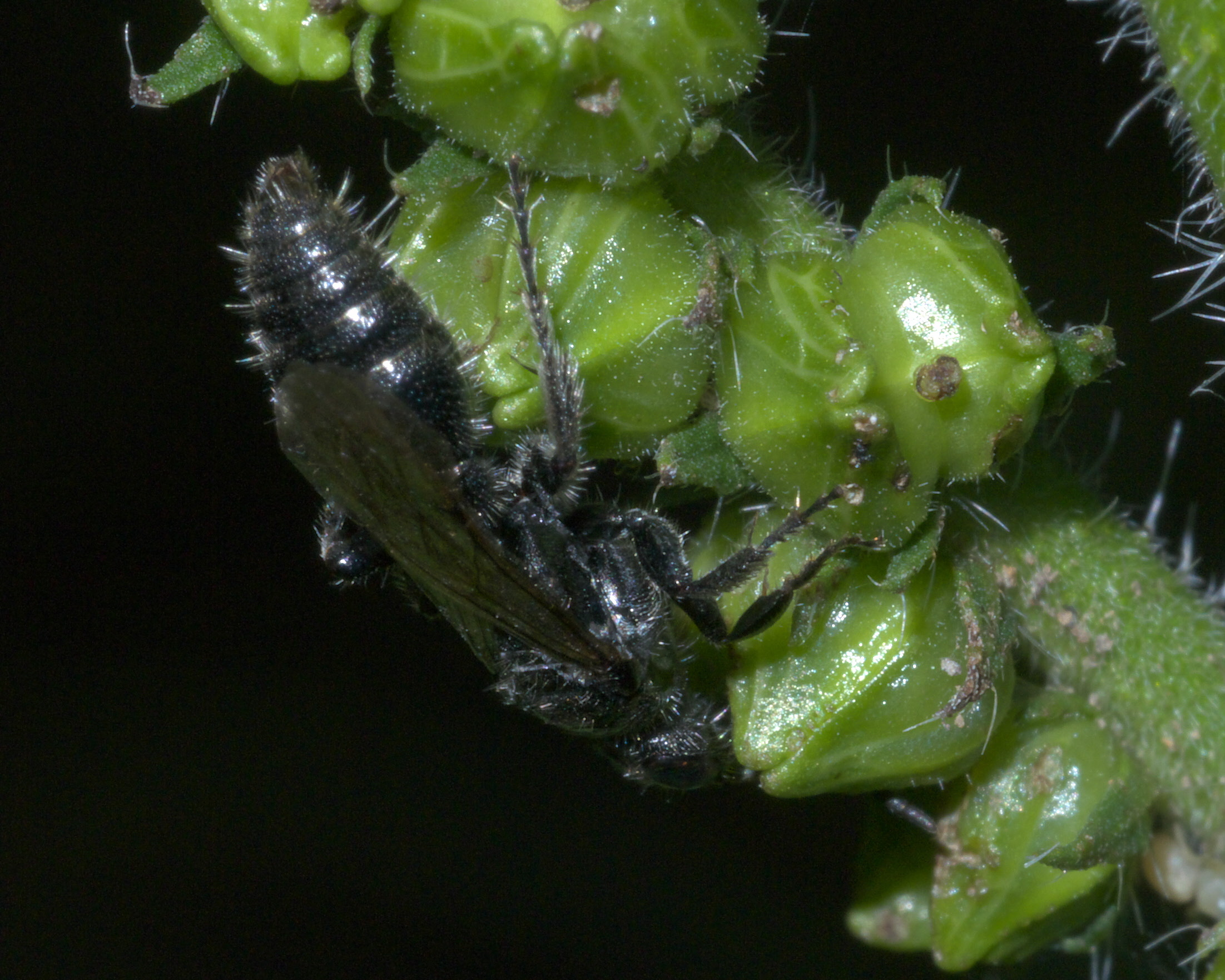
Tiphia

Recent research in molecular phylogenetics has resulted in the reorganization of the infraorder Aculeata, which now contains eight superfamilies: Apoidea, Chrysidoidea, Formicoidea, Pompiloidea, Scolioidea, Tiphioidea, Thynnoidea, and Vespoidea.
