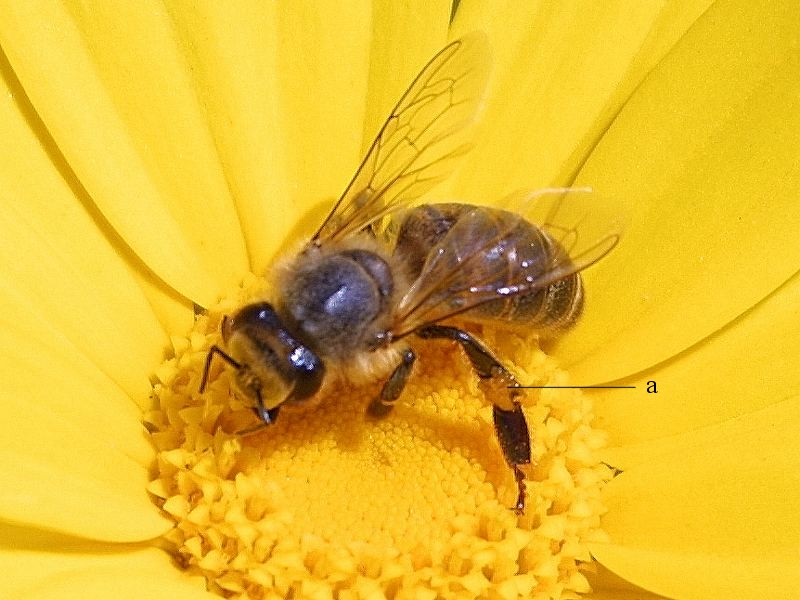
- Apis mellifera, the western honeybee

Scientific classification
- Kingdom: Animalia
- Phylum: Arthropoda
- Clade: Pancrustacea
- Class: Insecta
- Order: Hymenoptera
- Infraorder: Aculeata
- Superfamily: Apoidea; Latreille, 1802

Families
- Spheciformes: Ammoplanidae; Ampulicidae; Astatidae; Bembicidae; Crabronidae; Mellinidae; Pemphredonidae; Philanthidae; Psenidae; Sphecidae; †Angarosphecidae; †Paleomelittidae; †Temnogynidae; Clade Anthophila: Andrenidae; Apidae; Colletidae; Halictidae; Megachilidae; Melittidae; Stenotritidae

= Apoidea =

Superfamily of wasps and bees

The superfamily Apoidea is a major group (of over 30,000 species) within the Hymenoptera, which includes two traditionally recognized lineages, the "sphecoid" wasps, and the bees. Molecular phylogeny demonstrates that the bees arose from within the traditional "Crabronidae", so that grouping is paraphyletic, and this has led to a reclassification to produce monophyletic families.

== Diagnostic features ==
Apoid wasps and bees have several traits in common:

- The posterior (back) edge of the pronotum (pronotal lobe) is separated from the tegula
- In dorsal view (from above), the pronotum is short and broadly U-shaped;
- In dorsal view, a "propodeal triangle" at the posterior of the mesonotum;
- The hind basitarsus is longer than the other tarsomeres of the hind leg.

== Nomenclature ==
Bees appear in recent classifications to be a specialized lineage of "crabronid" wasps that switched to the use of pollen and nectar as larval food, rather than insect prey; this makes the traditional "Crabronidae" a paraphyletic group. Accordingly, bees and sphecoids are now all grouped together in a single superfamily, and the older available name is "Apoidea" rather than "Sphecoidea" (which, like Spheciformes, has been used in the past, but also defined a paraphyletic group and has been abandoned).

As bees (not including their wasp ancestors) are still considered a monophyletic group, they are given a grouping between superfamily and family to unify all bees, Anthophila.

== Phylogeny ==
- Aculeata
  - Chrysidoidea (cuckoo wasps and allies)
  - - - - Vespoidea (potter wasps, paper wasps, and others)
        - - - Sierolomorphidae (sierolomorphid wasps)
            - - - Tiphiidae (tiphiid wasps)
                - Thynnoidea (thynnid wasps and others)
              - Pompiloidea (spider wasps, velvet ants, and others)
      - - Scolioidea (scoliid wasps)
        - - Formicoidea (ants)
          - Apoidea (spheciform wasps and bees)

Phylogenetic position of Apoidea in the Aculeata.

This phylogenetic tree is based on Sann et al., 2018, which used phylogenomics to demonstrate that both the bees (Anthophila) and the Sphecidae arose from within the former "Crabronidae," which is therefore paraphyletic, and which they suggested should be split into several families; the former family Heterogynaidae nests in Nyssonini within the Bembicidae, as defined by these authors. These findings differ in several details from studies published by two other sets of authors in 2017, though all three studies demonstrate a paraphyletic "Crabronidae."

- Apoidea
  - Ampulicidae (Cockroach wasps)
  - - Astatidae
    - - - Bembicidae
        - - Sphecidae (sensu stricto)
          - - - Crabronidae (sensu stricto)
              - Mellinidae
      - - - Pemphredonidae
          - Philanthidae
        - - Psenidae
          - - - Ammoplanidae
              - Anthophila (bees)
