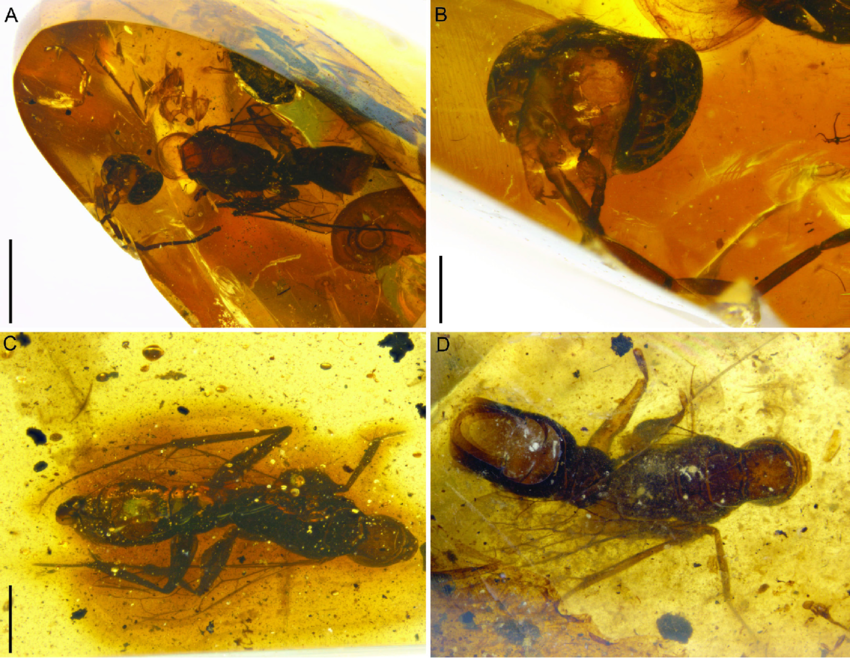
- Top left: dorsal view of †Rhapidogyna festiva; top right: head of †Rhapidogyna festiva; bottom left: dorsal view of †Rhapidogyna elongata; bottom right: dorsal view of †Rhapidogyna prima

Scientific classification
- Domain: Eukaryota
- Kingdom: Animalia
- Phylum: Arthropoda
- Class: Insecta
- Order: Hymenoptera
- Family: †Temnogynidae
- Genus: †Rhapidogyna; Rosa & Melo, 2024

Type species
- †Rhabdogyna festiva (now †Rhapidogyna festiva) Rosa & Melo, 2024

Species
- †Rhapidogyna elongata Rosa & Melo, 2024; †Rhapidogyna festiva Rosa & Melo, 2024; †Rhapidogyna prima Rosa & Melo, 2024

Synonyms
- †Rhabdogyna Rosa & Melo, 2024, unavailable name, not Rhabdogyna Millidge, 1985

= Rhapidogyna =

Extinct genus of wasps

Rhapidogyna is an extinct genus of apoid wasps, found only in Burmese amber. Rhapidogyna is a replacement name for an unavailable name, Rhabdogyna, already in use for a genus of spiders.

== Taxonomy ==
The genus was erected in 2024, and was initially given the name Rhabdogyna. However, this had already been used for a genus of spiders, so the replacement name Rhapidogyna was published later in 2024. Three species have been described.
