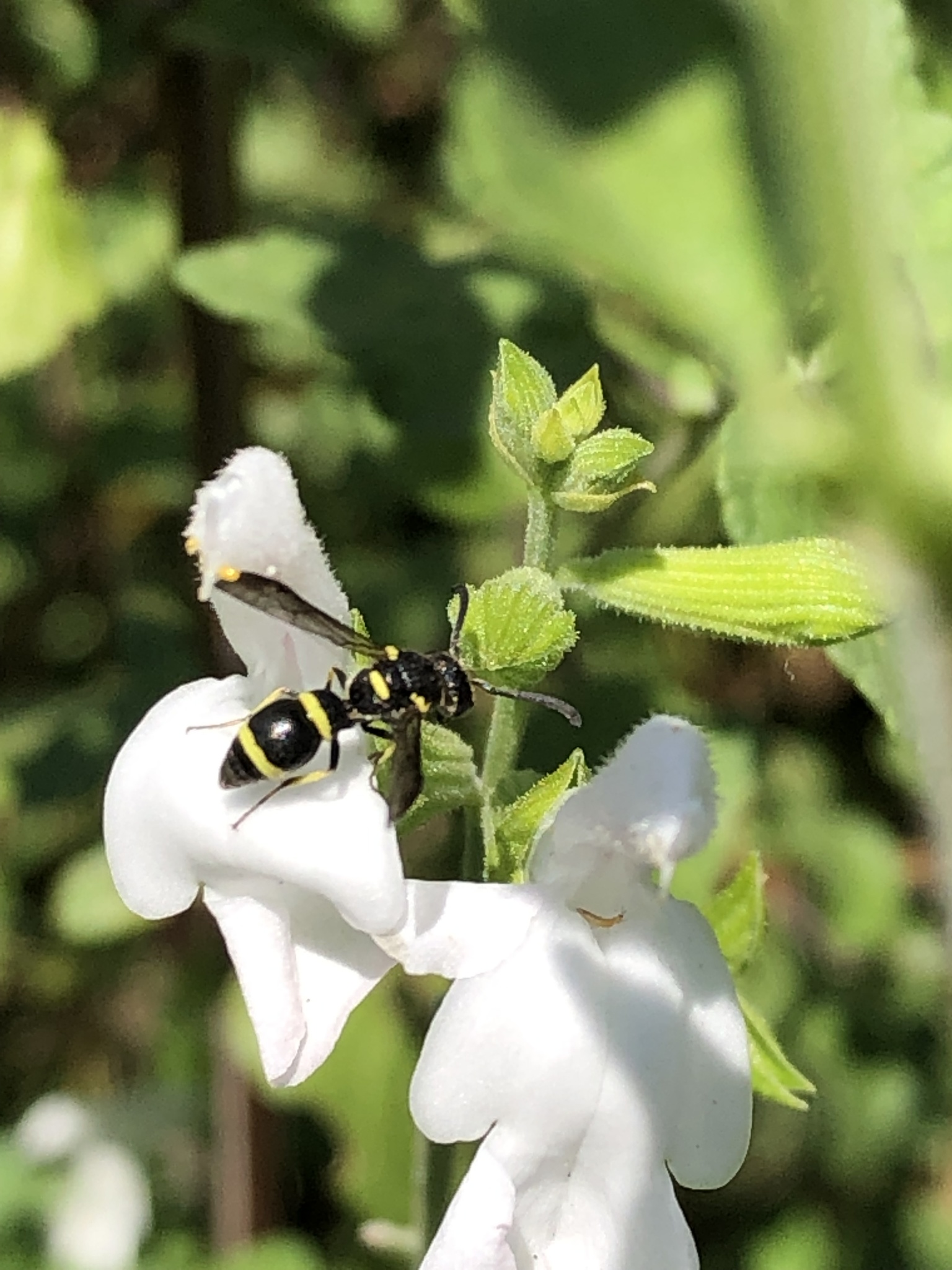

Scientific classification
- Domain: Eukaryota
- Kingdom: Animalia
- Phylum: Arthropoda
- Class: Insecta
- Order: Hymenoptera
- Family: Vespidae
- Subfamily: Eumeninae
- Genus: Parancistrocerus
- Species: P. declivatus

Binomial name
- Parancistrocerus declivatus (Bohart, 1948)

Synonyms
- Stenodynerus declivatus

= Parancistrocerus declivatus =

North American potter wasp

Parancistrocerus declivatus is a species of potter wasp native to the southern coastal counties of California and Baja California in North America. This wasp was originally categorized in the genus Stenodynerus. The type locality was La Laguna, Sierra Laguna, Baja California.

== See also ==
- List of Parancistrocerus species
