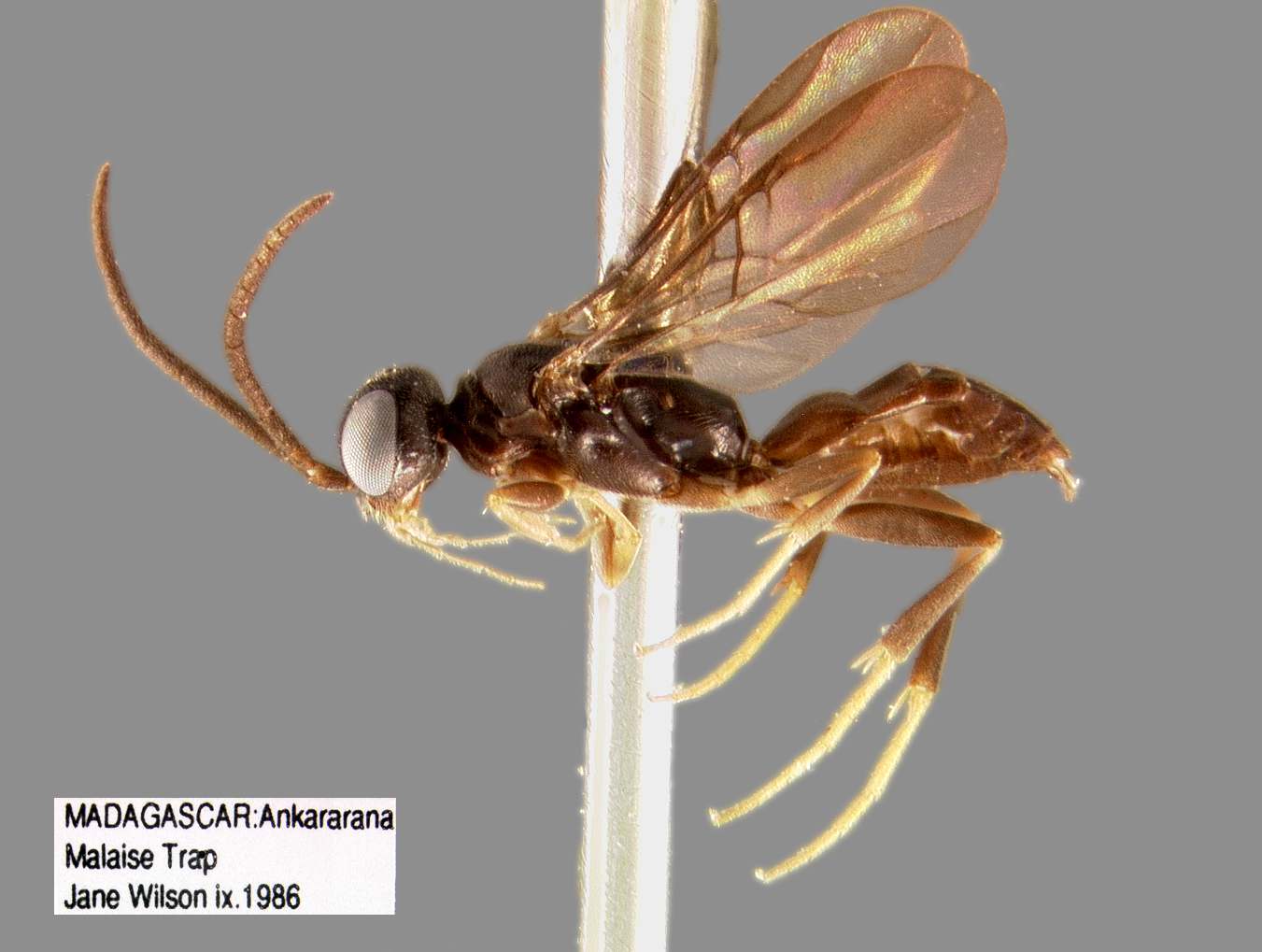

Scientific classification
- Kingdom: Animalia
- Phylum: Arthropoda
- Clade: Pancrustacea
- Class: Insecta
- Order: Hymenoptera
- Family: Bembicidae
- Tribe: Nyssonini
- Genus: Heterogyna; Nagy, 1969

Species
- Heterogyna botswana; Heterogyna fantsilotra; Heterogyna kugleri; Heterogyna madecassa; Heterogyna nocticola; Heterogyna polita; Heterogyna protea; Heterogyna ravenala

= Heterogyna =

Genus of wasps

Heterogyna is a genus of eight described species of small spheciform wasps occurring in Madagascar, Botswana, Turkmenistan, Oman, the United Arab Emirates, and the Eastern Mediterranean area. The majority are dark in color and range in size from approximately 1.5 to 5.0 mm. Most specimens have been collected in arid climates, but one species from Madagascar is known to occur in a humid forest habitat. Although males have functional wings, heterogynaid females are typically brachypterous, a trait which is unique among spheciform wasps. Wing venation is reduced in both sexes. All species are diurnal, with the exception of H. nocticola. Other aspects of their biology are completely unknown, but details of their morphology have prompted researchers to hypothesize that they may be non-fossorial parasitoids adapted to hunt in tight spaces, such as under tree bark. This is speculative and has not yet been confirmed by actual observations of behavior. It is also possible that modifications of the female metasomal tergum VI and gonostyli may represent a unique prey transport mechanism, but this is also unconfirmed.

The Heterogynaidae were historically considered the sister taxon to the remainder of the Apoidea, but recent studies utilizing molecular characters do not support this hypothesis. While monophyly of the genus is strongly supported, it is now considered to be related to the Crabronidae or, most recently, a lineage within the Bembicidae.
