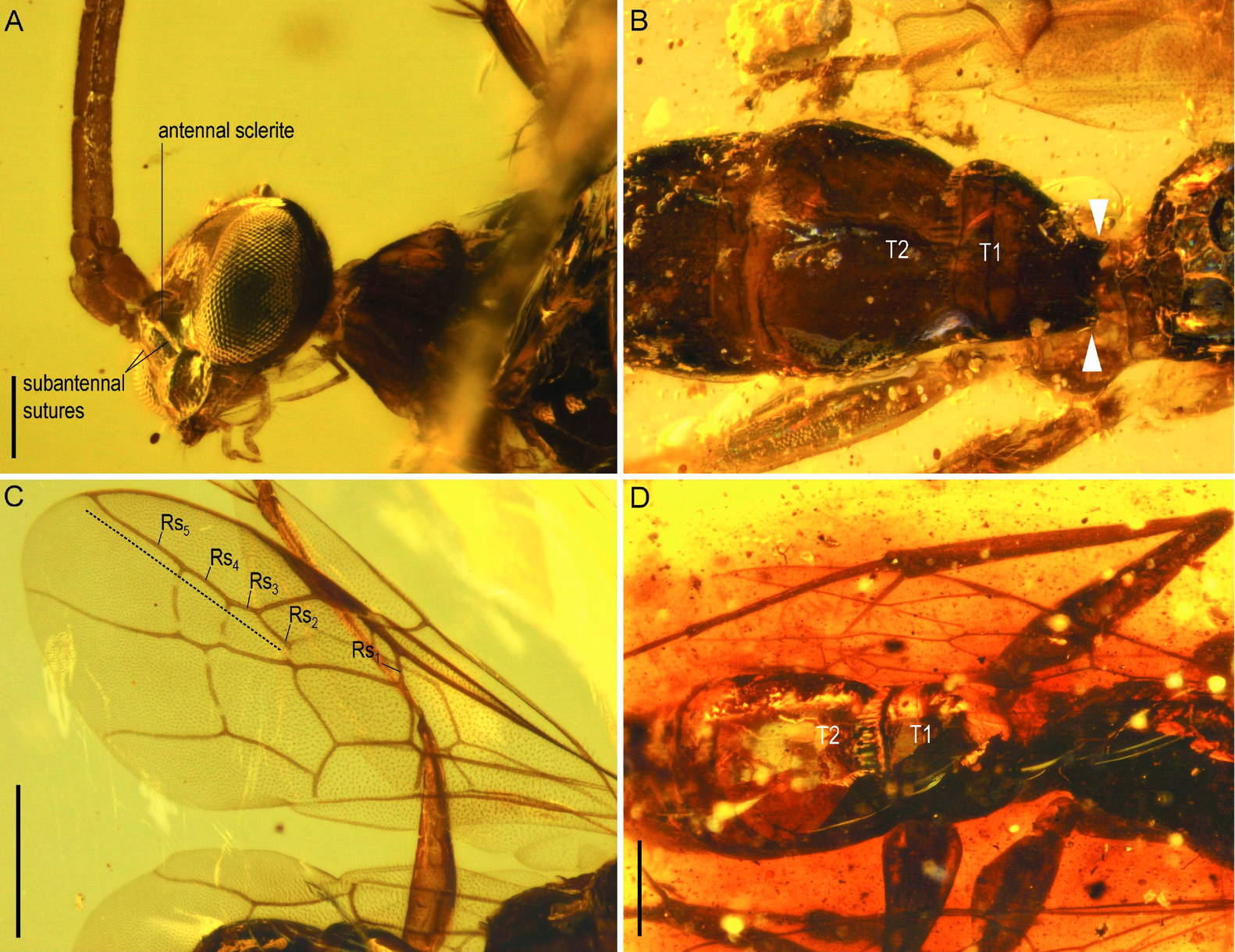
- Top left: lateral view of head and pronotum of †Temnogyna elegans Top right: dorsal view of anterior part of metasoma of †Temnogyna aff. elegans, male Bottom left: fore and hindwing of †Temnogyna elegans Bottom right: dorsal view of anterior part of metasoma of †Rhapidogyna elongata

Scientific classification
- Domain: Eukaryota
- Kingdom: Animalia
- Phylum: Arthropoda
- Class: Insecta
- Order: Hymenoptera
- Superfamily: Apoidea
- Family: †Temnogynidae; Rosa & Melo, 2024

Genera
- †Rhapidogyna Rosa & Melo, 2024; †Temnogyna Rosa & Melo, 2024

= Temnogynidae =

Extinct family of wasps

Temnogynidae is an extinct family of apoid wasps, found only in Burmese amber. The family was erected in 2024 with two genera. One of the genera was initially given the same name as a genus of spiders, Rhabdogyna. This name was later replaced by Rhapidogyna.
