= Mellinus bimaculatus =

Scientific classification
- Domain: Eukaryota
- Kingdom: Animalia
- Phylum: Arthropoda
- Class: Insecta
- Order: Hymenoptera
- Family: Mellinidae
- Genus: Mellinus
- Species: M. bimaculatus

Binomial name
- Mellinus bimaculatus Packard, 1867

Synonyms
- Mellinus wolcotti H. Smith, 1908

Species of wasp

Mellinus bimaculatus is a species of wasp in the family Mellinidae. It is found in Central America and North America.
