= Mellinus rufinodus =

Scientific classification
- Domain: Eukaryota
- Kingdom: Animalia
- Phylum: Arthropoda
- Class: Insecta
- Order: Hymenoptera
- Family: Mellinidae
- Genus: Mellinus
- Species: M. rufinodus

Binomial name
- Mellinus rufinodus Cresson, 1865

Species of wasp

Mellinus rufinodus is a species of wasp in the family Mellinidae. It is found in Central America and North America.
