= Hypancistrocerus =

Scientific classification
- Domain: Eukaryota
- Kingdom: Animalia
- Phylum: Arthropoda
- Class: Insecta
- Order: Hymenoptera
- Family: Vespidae
- Subfamily: Eumeninae
- Genus: Hypancistrocerus; Saussure, 1855

Type species
- Odynerus advena Saussure, 1855

Species
- See text

Genus of wasps

Hypancistrocerus is a rather small neotropical genus of potter wasps which is very close to the Genus Stenodynerus. The species included in the genus are:

- Hypancistrocerus abdominalis (Fox, 1902)
- Hypancistrocerus advena (Saussure, 1856)
- Hypancistrocerus anomalicornis (Berton, 1918)
- Hypancistrocerus antennatus (Zavattari, 1912)
- Hypancistrocerus belizensis (Cameron, 1908)
- Hypancistrocerus carnifer (Kirsch, 1878)
- Hypancistrocerus catamarcensis Brethes, 1903
- Hypancistrocerus coxalis (Fox, 1902)
- Hypancistrocerus dallatorrei (Brethes, 1906)
- Hypancistrocerus dentiformis (Fox, 1902)
- Hypancistrocerus divergens (Zavattari, 1912)
- Hypancistrocerus inusiatus (Fox, 1902)
- Hypancistrocerus reflexus (Fox, 1902)
- Hypancistrocerus torquatus (Zavattari, 1912)
