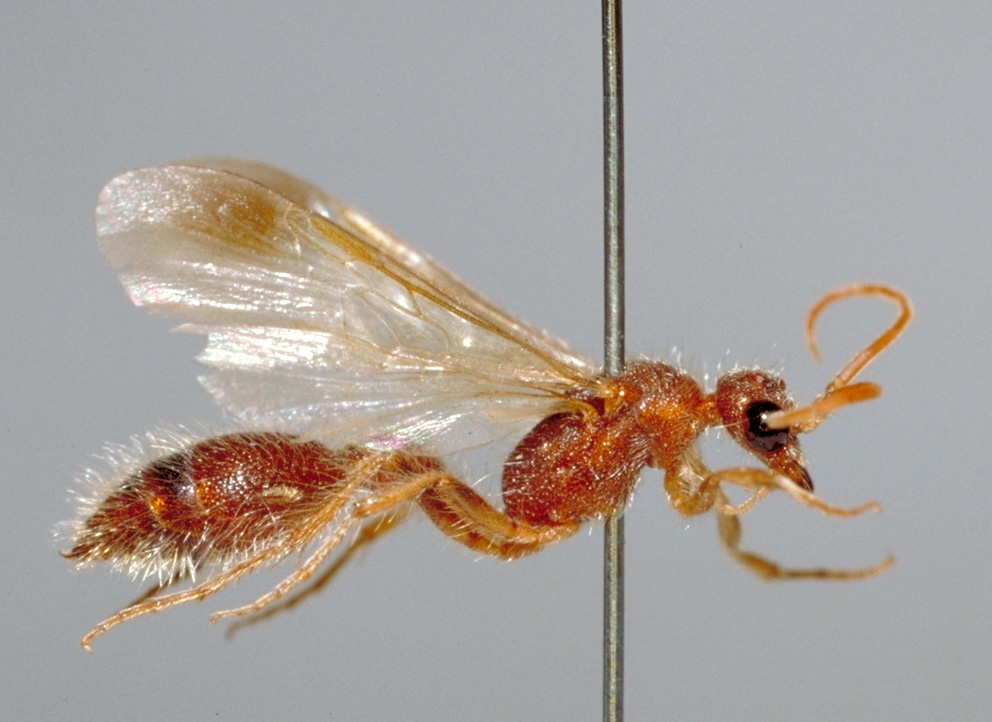
- Chyphotes male
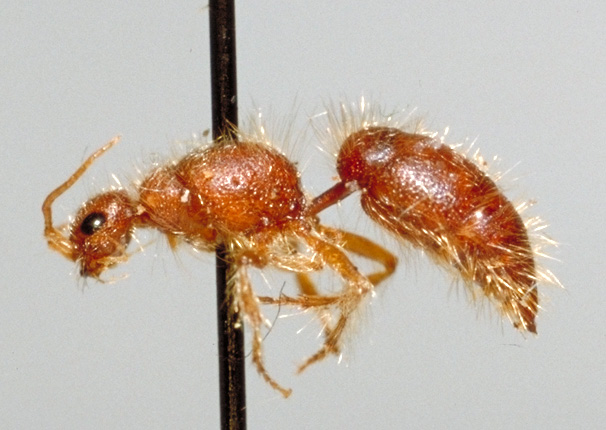
- Chyphotes female

Scientific classification
- Domain: Eukaryota
- Kingdom: Animalia
- Phylum: Arthropoda
- Class: Insecta
- Order: Hymenoptera
- Superfamily: Thynnoidea
- Family: Chyphotidae

Genera
- See text

= Chyphotidae =

Family of wasps

The Chyphotidae are a family of wasps with wingless females similar to the Mutillidae, differing most visibly in the presence, in females, of a suture separating the pronotum from the mesonotum. These species are found primarily in arid regions in the southwestern United States and adjacent regions in Mexico.

== Taxonomy ==
Recent classifications of Vespoidea sensu lato (beginning in 2008) removed two of the subfamilies formerly placed in the family Bradynobaenidae to a separate family Chyphotidae, thus restricting true bradynobaenids to the Old World, with chyphotids being restricted to the New World.

The genera are classified as follows:

=== Subfamily Chyphotinae ===
- Chyphotes Blake, 1886

=== Subfamily Typhoctinae ===
==== Tribe Eotillini ====
- Eotilla Schuster, 1949
- Prototilla Schuster, 1949

==== Tribe Typhoctini ====
- Typhoctes Ashmead, 1899
- Typhoctoides Brothers, 1974
