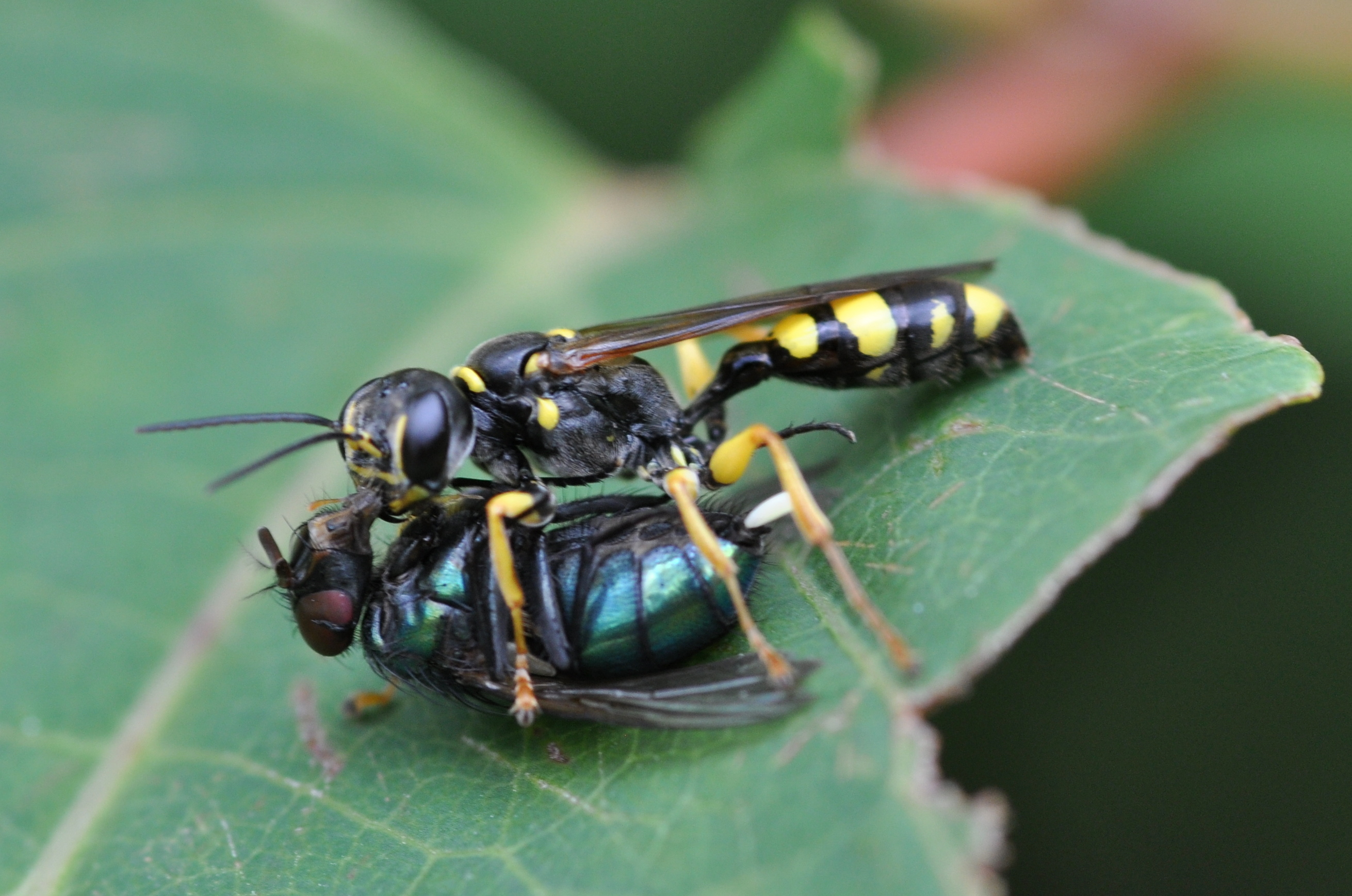
- Mellinus arvensis with prey

Scientific classification
- Kingdom: Animalia
- Phylum: Arthropoda
- Class: Insecta
- Order: Hymenoptera
- Family: Mellinidae
- Genus: Mellinus; Fabricius, 1790

Type species
- Mellinus arvensis (Linnaeus, 1758)

Synonyms
- Trachogorytes R. Bohart, 2000

= Mellinus =

Genus of wasps

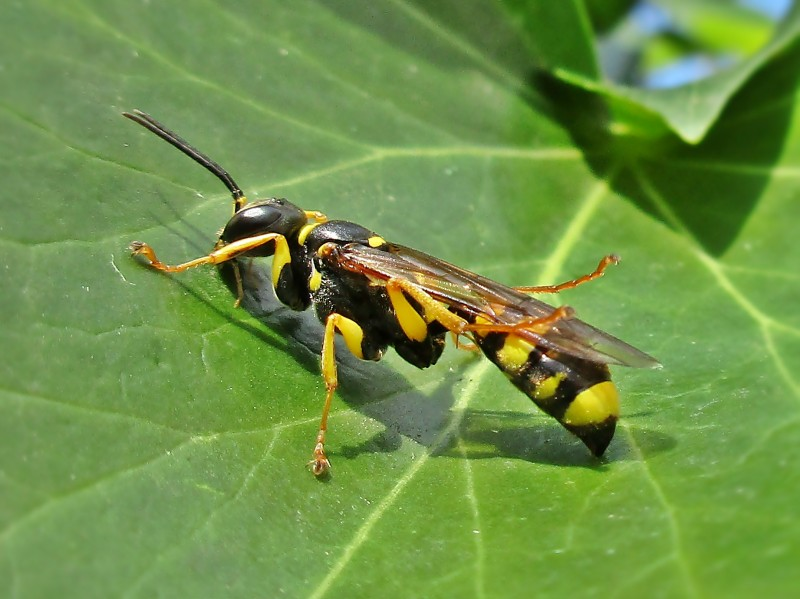
Mellinus arvensis, the Netherlands

Mellinus is a genus of wasps in the family Mellinidae. The species are found in the Palearctic, Nearctic, the Neotropics and the Orient. 16 species are known

== Species (Europe) ==
- Mellinus arvensis (Linnaeus, 1758)
- Mellinus crabroneus (Thunberg, 1791)

== Species (worldwide) ==
These 16 species belong to the genus Mellinus:

- Mellinus abdominalis Cresson, 1882^{i c g}
- Mellinus alpestris Cameron, 1890^{i c g}
- Mellinus andinus Menke, 1996^{i c g}
- Mellinus arvensis (Linnaeus, 1758)^{i c g}
- Mellinus bimaculatus Packard, 1867^{i c g b}
- Mellinus costaricae (R. Bohart, 2000)^{i c g}
- Mellinus crabroneus (Thunberg, 1791)^{i c g}
- Mellinus globulosus (Fourcroy, 1785)^{i c g}
- Mellinus hansoni Menke, 1996^{i c g}
- Mellinus iani Menke, 1996^{i c g}
- Mellinus imperialis R. Bohart, 1968^{i c g b}
- Mellinus obscurus Handlirsch, 1888^{i c g}
- Mellinus orientalis S. Gupta, Gayubo and Pulawski, 2008^{i c g}
- Mellinus pygmaeus Handlirsch, 1888^{i c g}
- Mellinus rufinodus Cresson, 1865^{i c g b}
- Mellinus satanicus Siri and R. Bohart, 1974^{i c g}

Data sources: i = ITIS, c = Catalogue of Life, g = GBIF, b = Bugguide.net
