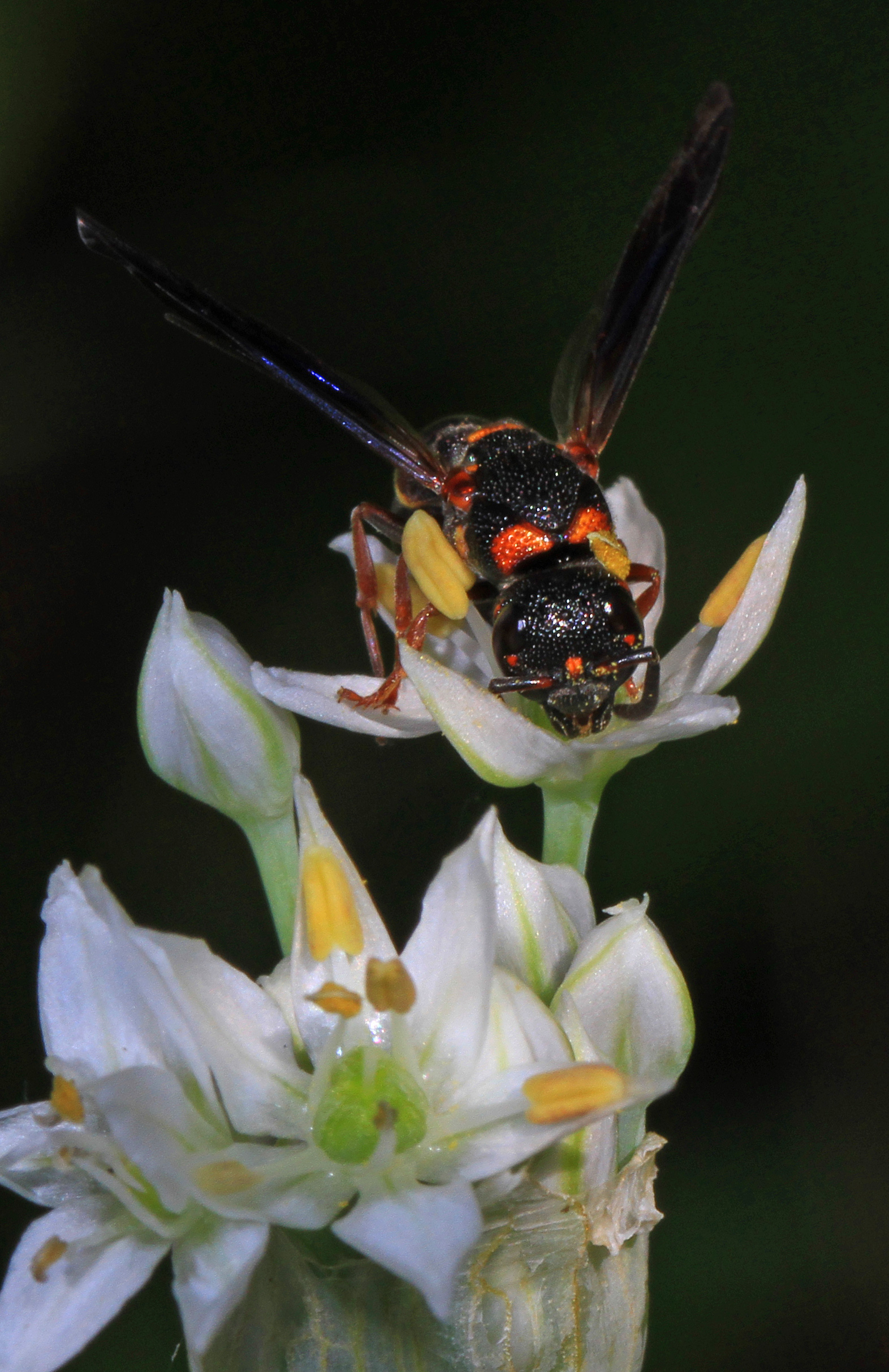

Scientific classification
- Kingdom: Animalia
- Phylum: Arthropoda
- Class: Insecta
- Order: Hymenoptera
- Family: Vespidae
- Genus: Parancistrocerus
- Species: P. histrio

Binomial name
- Parancistrocerus histrio (Lepeletier, 1841)

= Parancistrocerus histrio =

Species of wasp

Parancistrocerus histrio is a species of stinging wasp in the family Vespidae.
