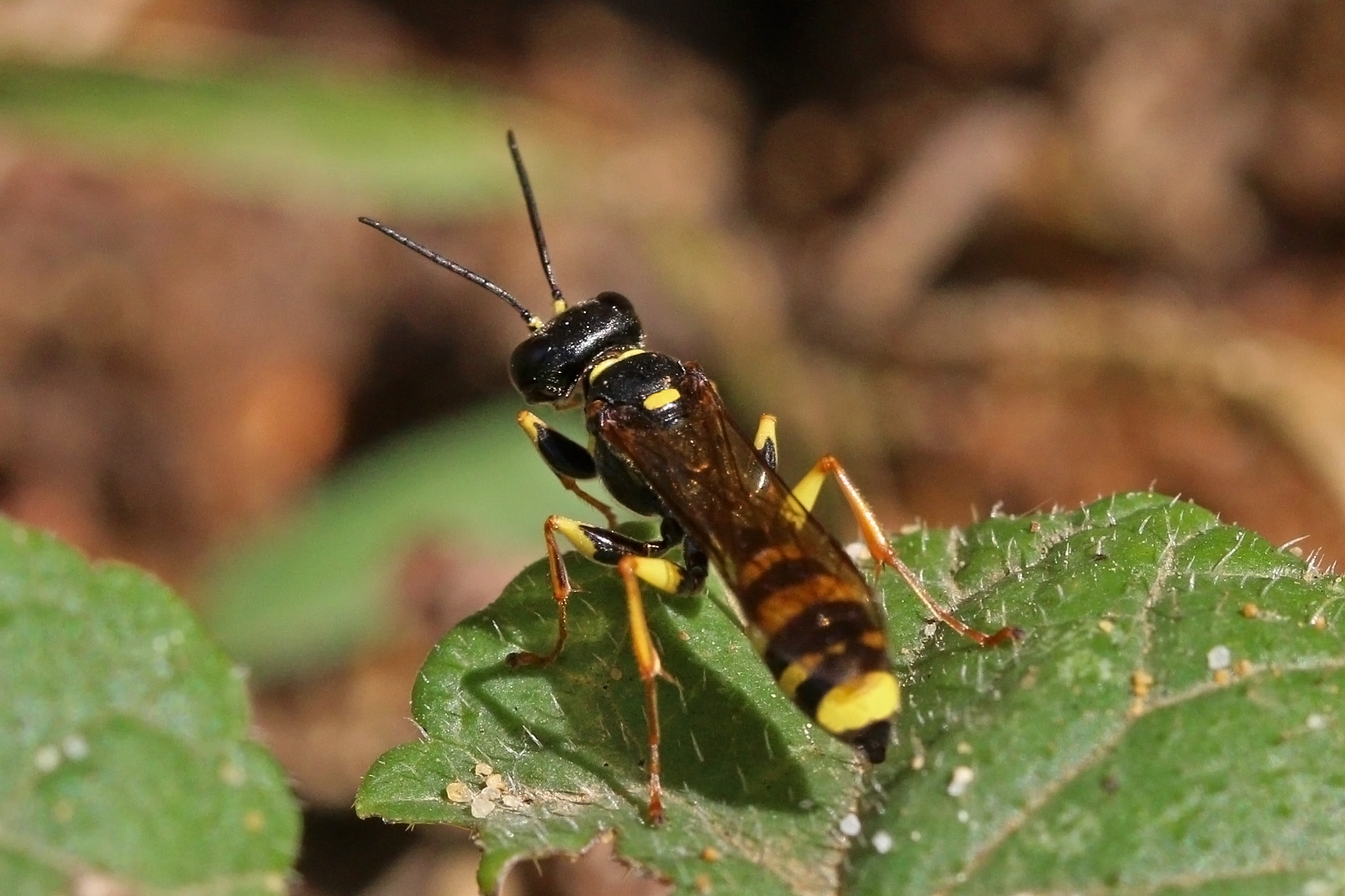

Scientific classification
- Kingdom: Animalia
- Phylum: Arthropoda
- Class: Insecta
- Order: Hymenoptera
- Family: Mellinidae
- Genus: Mellinus
- Species: M. arvensis

Binomial name
- Mellinus arvensis (Linnaeus, 1758)

= Mellinus arvensis =

Species of wasp

Mellinus arvensis, the field digger wasp, is a species of solitary wasp. The wasp can commonly be found from July to late September or October in sandy places. In hard soil however the female will often try to steal a nest from another member of the same species. The female is larger than the male. The wasps' nests are underground in sandy burrows with flies for their offspring to eat. The species is yellow and black like many wasp species, but they have a more narrow waist. This species is the most dominant immediately following forest fires.

== Nesting Behaviors ==
The field digger wasps are solitary hunters, yet live in colonies with one another. Female members of the community will dig out multicellular nests in the sand or soil to lay their eggs, then provision the cells with prey, with the most common one being flies. When the soil is too hard for digging, females will either take over an abandoned nest, or will usurp a nest from another female.
