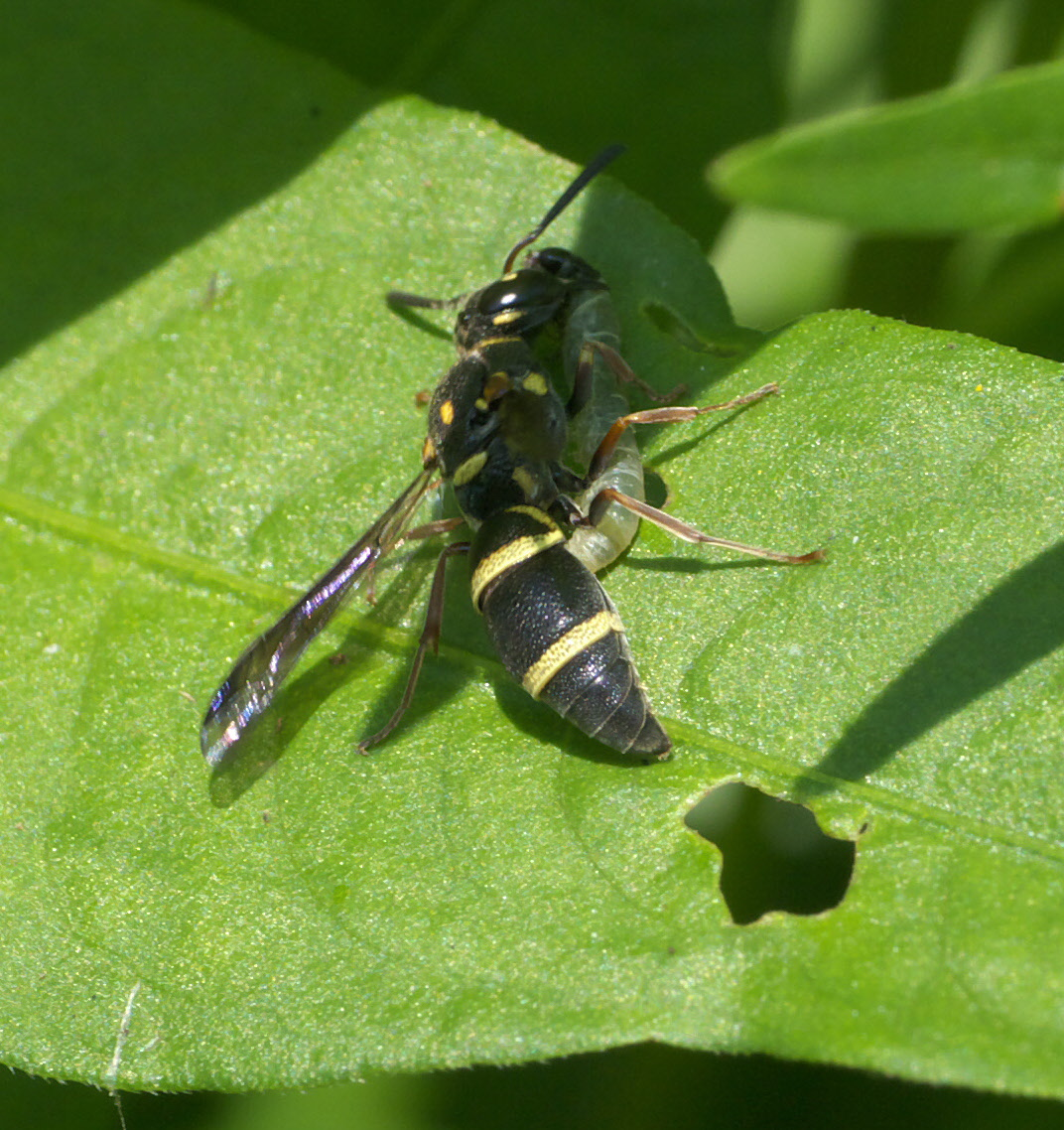

Scientific classification
- Kingdom: Animalia
- Phylum: Arthropoda
- Clade: Pancrustacea
- Class: Insecta
- Order: Hymenoptera
- Family: Vespidae
- Genus: Parancistrocerus
- Species: P. fulvipes

Binomial name
- Parancistrocerus fulvipes (de Saussure, 1856)

= Parancistrocerus fulvipes =

Species of wasp

Parancistrocerus fulvipes is a species of stinging wasp in the family Vespidae. This species' nesting sites include borings in wood, old mud dauber and Polistes nests, and abandoned burrows of ground-nesting bees, but it may also construct its own burrows in the ground. Prey includes caterpillars of Tortricidae, Nolidae, Chloephorinae, Crambidae, and Gelechiidae.

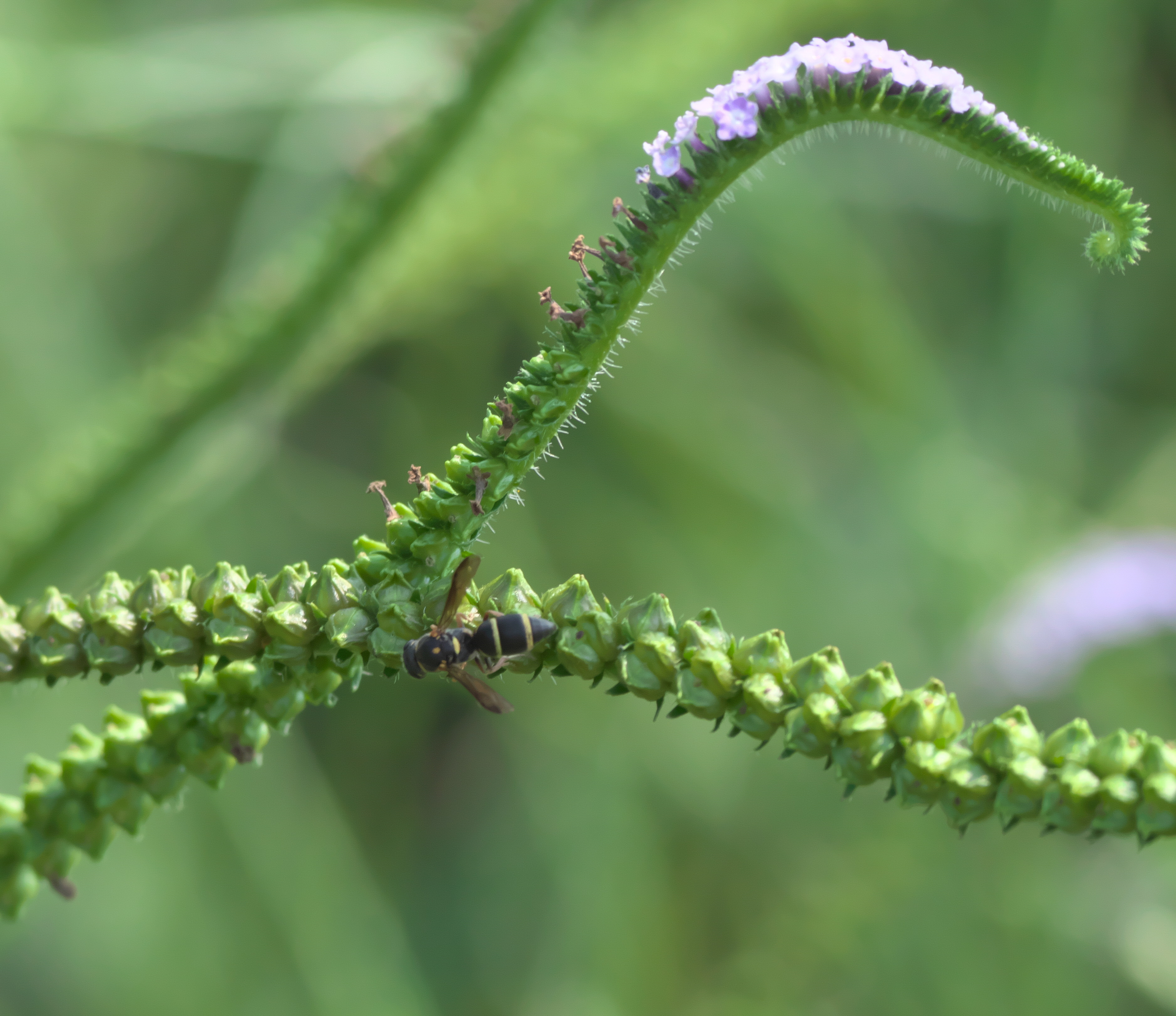

== Subspecies ==
These two subspecies belong to the species Parancistrocerus fulvipes:

- Parancistrocerus fulvipes fulvipes^{g}
- Parancistrocerus fulvipes rufovestis Bohart, 1948^{g b}

Data sources: i = ITIS, c = Catalogue of Life, g = GBIF, b = Bugguide.net
