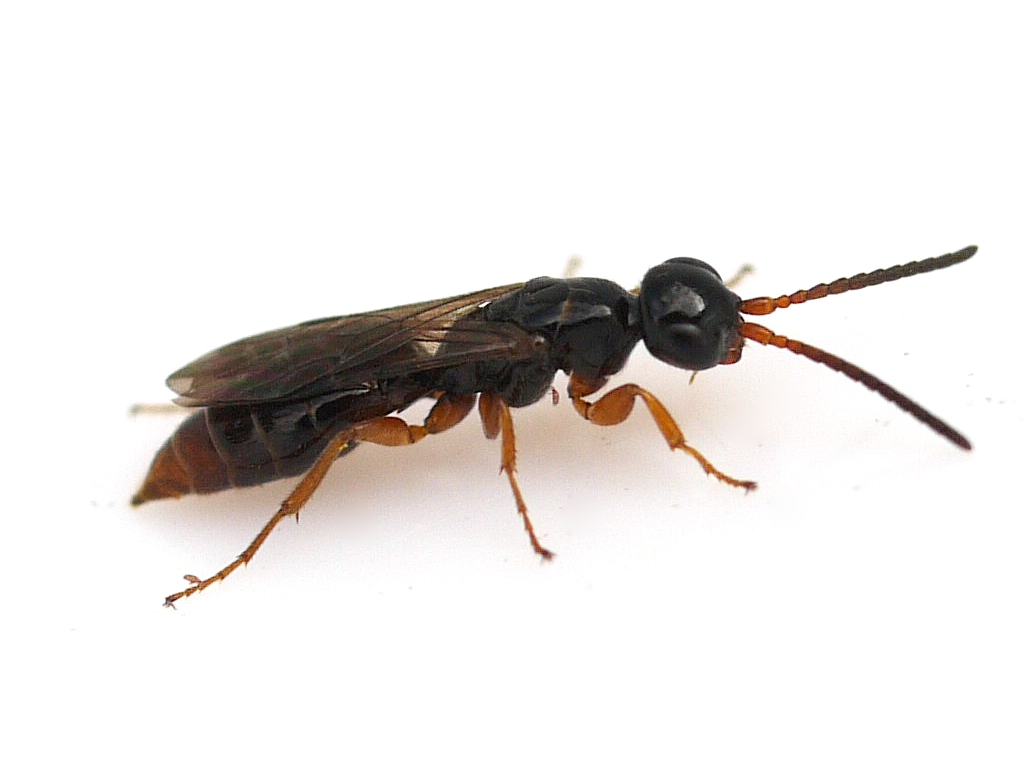

Scientific classification
- Kingdom: Animalia
- Phylum: Arthropoda
- Class: Insecta
- Order: Hymenoptera
- Family: Sierolomorphidae
- Genus: Sierolomorpha
- Species: S. canadensis

Binomial name
- Sierolomorpha canadensis Provancher, 1888

= Sierolomorpha canadensis =

Species of wasp

Sierolomorpha canadensis is a species of wasp in the family Sierolomorphidae.
