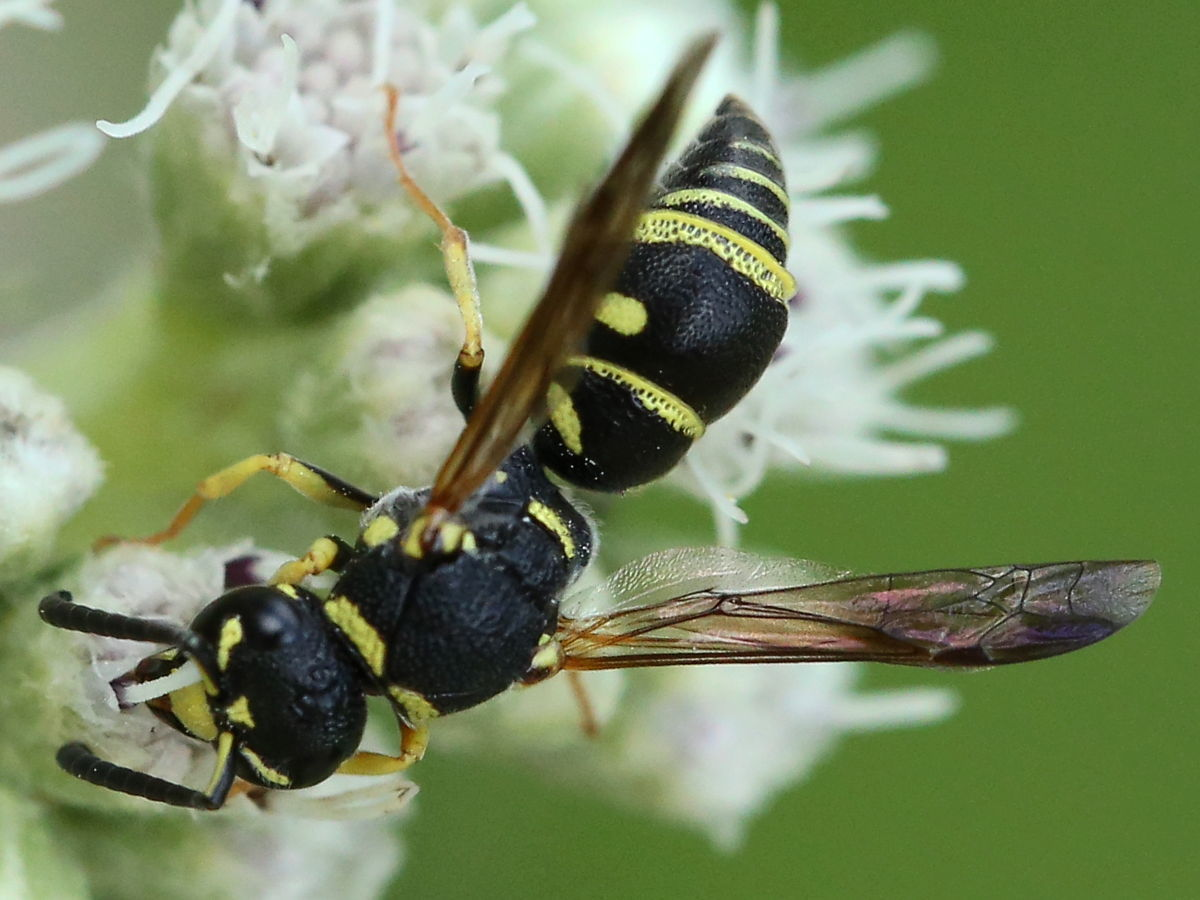

Scientific classification
- Kingdom: Animalia
- Phylum: Arthropoda
- Clade: Pancrustacea
- Class: Insecta
- Order: Hymenoptera
- Family: Vespidae
- Genus: Parancistrocerus
- Species: P. leionotus

Binomial name
- Parancistrocerus leionotus (Viereck, 1906)

= Parancistrocerus leionotus =

Species of wasp

Parancistrocerus leionotus is a species of potter wasp in the family Vespidae.

== Ecology ==
Unlike most related species, this wasp uses small cavities in rocks or concrete as nest sites.
