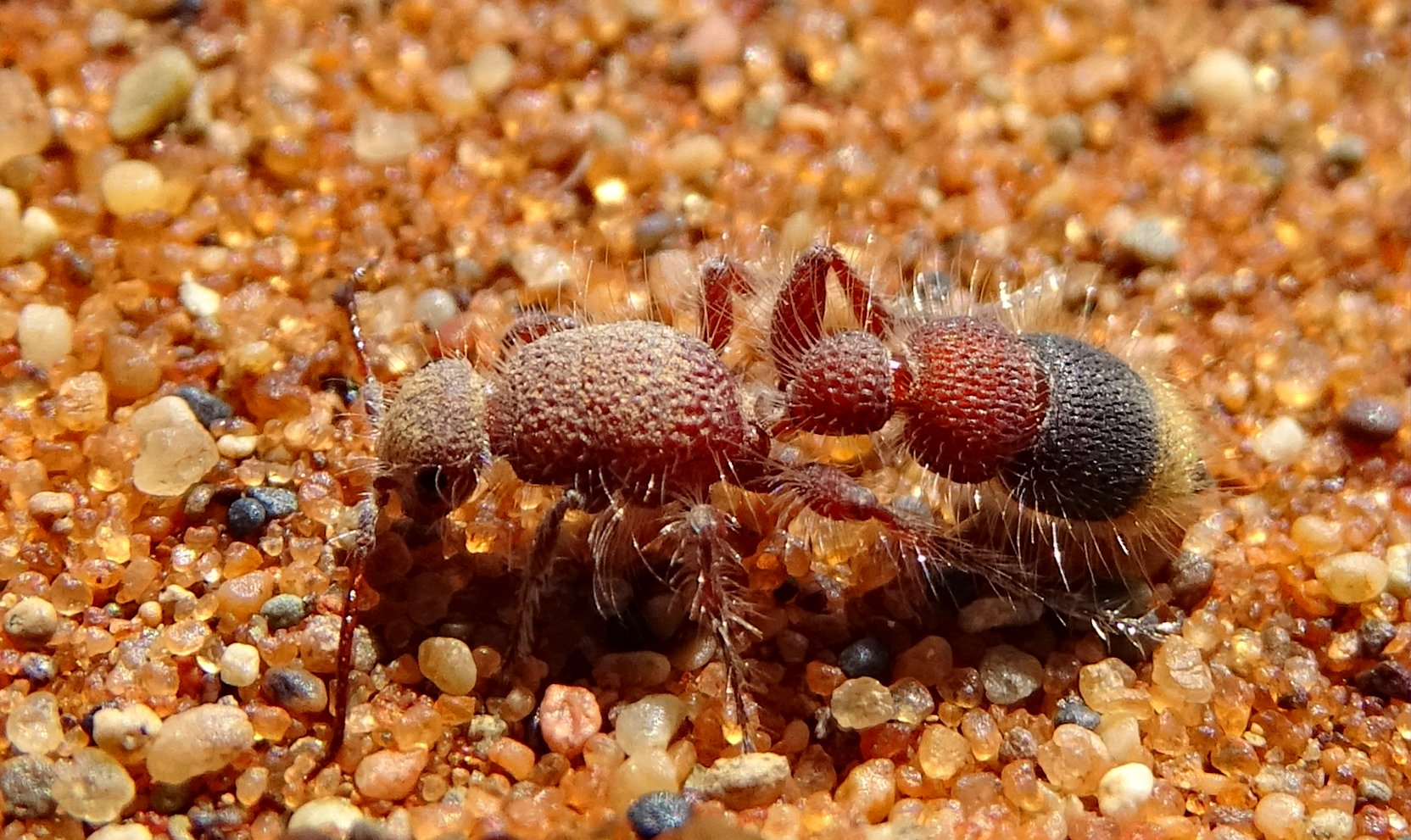
- Apterogyna female, Namibia

Scientific classification
- Domain: Eukaryota
- Kingdom: Animalia
- Phylum: Arthropoda
- Class: Insecta
- Order: Hymenoptera
- Superfamily: Tiphioidea
- Family: Bradynobaenidae

Genera
- See text

= Bradynobaenidae =

Family of wasps

The Bradynobaenidae are a family of wasps similar to the Mutillidae, differing most visibly in the presence, in females, of a suture separating the pronotum from the mesonotum. These species are often found in arid regions.

== Taxonomy ==
Recent classifications (beginning in 2008) remove two of the constituent subfamilies, both from the New World, to a separate family Chyphotidae, thus restricting true bradynobaenids to the Old World.

The retained genera are classified as follows:

=== Subfamily Apterogyninae ===
- Apterogyna Latreille, 1809
- Gynecaptera Skorikov, 1935
- Macroocula Panfilov, 1954
- Micatagla Argaman, 1994 (at least 54 living species per Gadallah, et al., 2019)

=== Subfamily Bradynobaeninae ===
- Bradynobaenus Spinola, 1851

== Genera placed in Chyphotidae ==
Five genera were transferred to Chyphotidae and are no longer considered members of Bradynobaenidae:

- Chyphotes Blake, 1886
- Eotilla Schuster, 1949
- Prototilla Schuster, 1949
- Typhoctes Ashmead, 1899
- Typhoctoides Brothers, 1974
