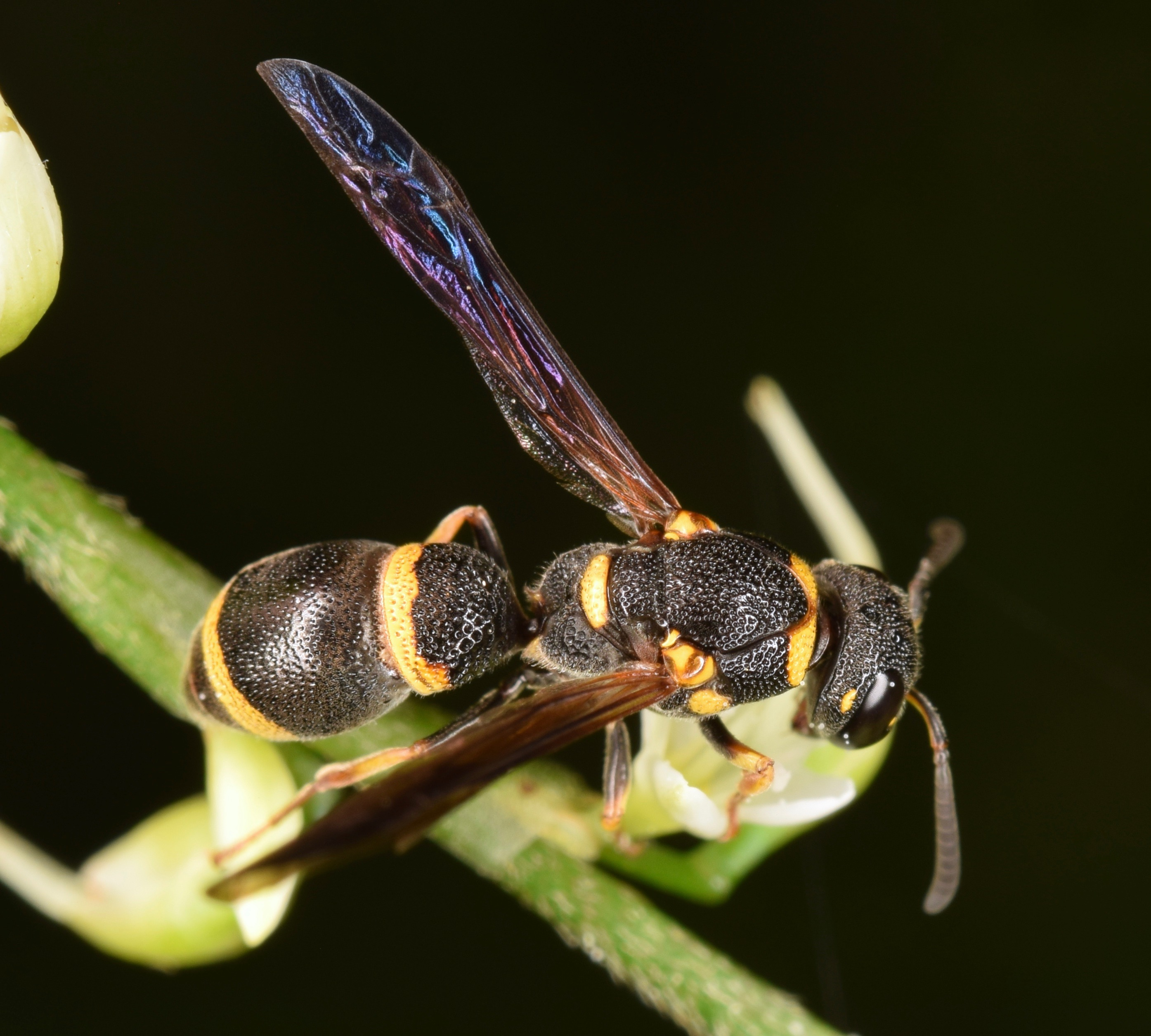

Scientific classification
- Domain: Eukaryota
- Kingdom: Animalia
- Phylum: Arthropoda
- Class: Insecta
- Order: Hymenoptera
- Family: Vespidae
- Genus: Parancistrocerus
- Species: P. perennis

Binomial name
- Parancistrocerus perennis (de Saussure, 1857)

= Parancistrocerus perennis =

Species of stinging wasp

Parancistrocerus perennis, or two-banded mason wasp, is a species of stinging wasp in the family Vespidae. The species is native to the eastern parts of North America.

== Subspecies ==
These two subspecies belong to the species Parancistrocerus perennis:

- Parancistrocerus perennis anacardivora (Rohwer, 1915)
- Parancistrocerus perennis perennis
