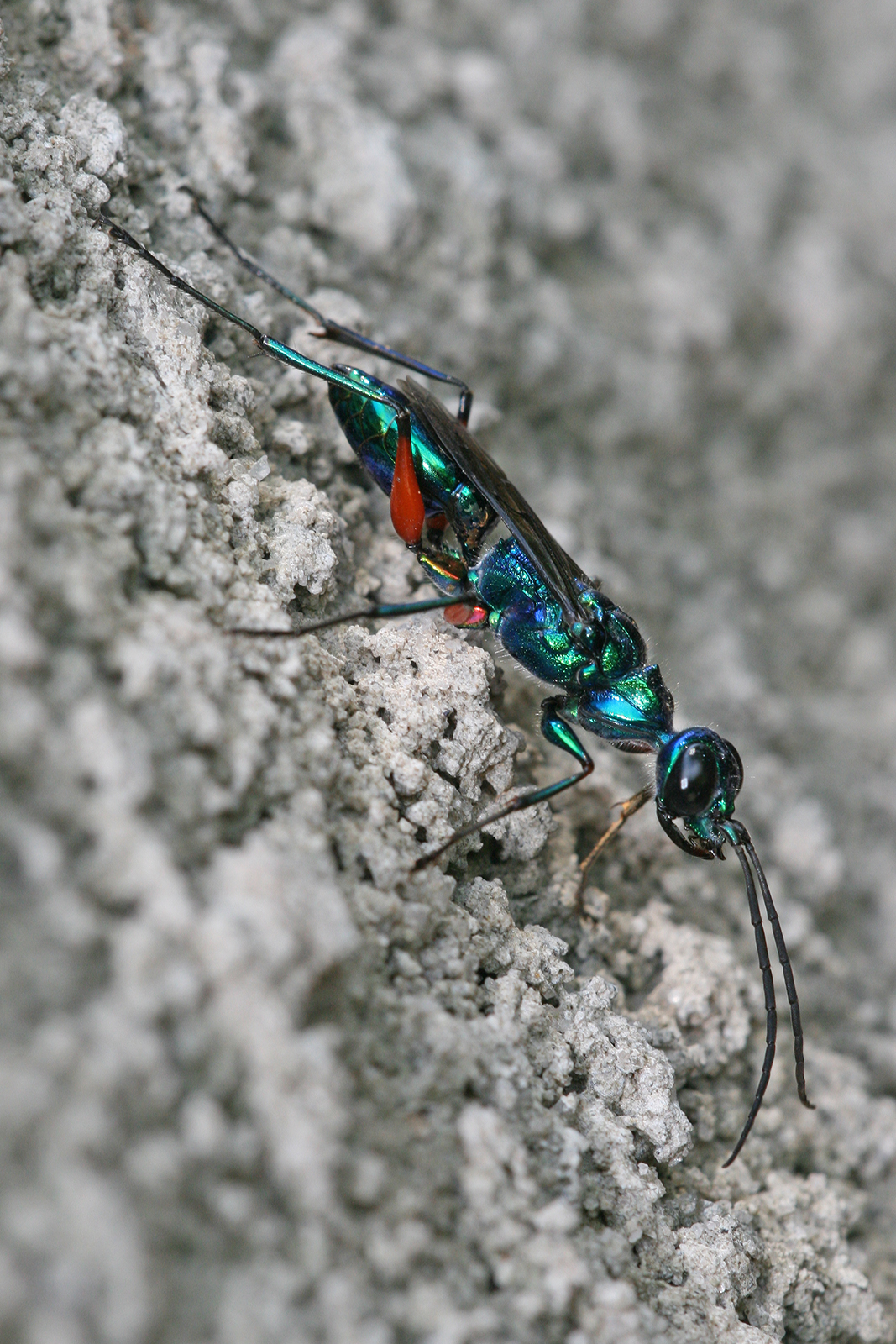
- Ampulex compressa

Scientific classification
- Kingdom: Animalia
- Phylum: Arthropoda
- Clade: Pancrustacea
- Class: Insecta
- Order: Hymenoptera
- Superfamily: Apoidea
- (unranked): Spheciformes

Families
- Ammoplanidae; Ampulicidae; Astatidae; Bembicidae; Crabronidae; Mellinidae; Pemphredonidae; Philanthidae; Psenidae; Sphecidae

= Spheciformes =

Lineage of wasps

Spheciformes is an obsolete paraphyletic assemblage of insect families which collectively comprise the "sphecoid wasps", and includes about 10,000 species and several hundred genera. The largest genus is Cerceris (Philanthidae), with almost 900 species. Larvae are carnivorous, consuming prey captured by adult females and typically paralyzed with venom, provisioned in underground nests.

Spheciformes includes all the members of the superfamily Apoidea which are not bees and which in older classifications were called the "Sphecoidea". The group includes familiar types of wasps such as mud daubers, digger wasps, sand wasps, cicada killers, and cockroach wasps.

The group is paraphyletic because bees are believed to have arisen from a subgroup within the family Ammoplanidae, thus Spheciformes does not include all of the descendants of its common ancestor.
