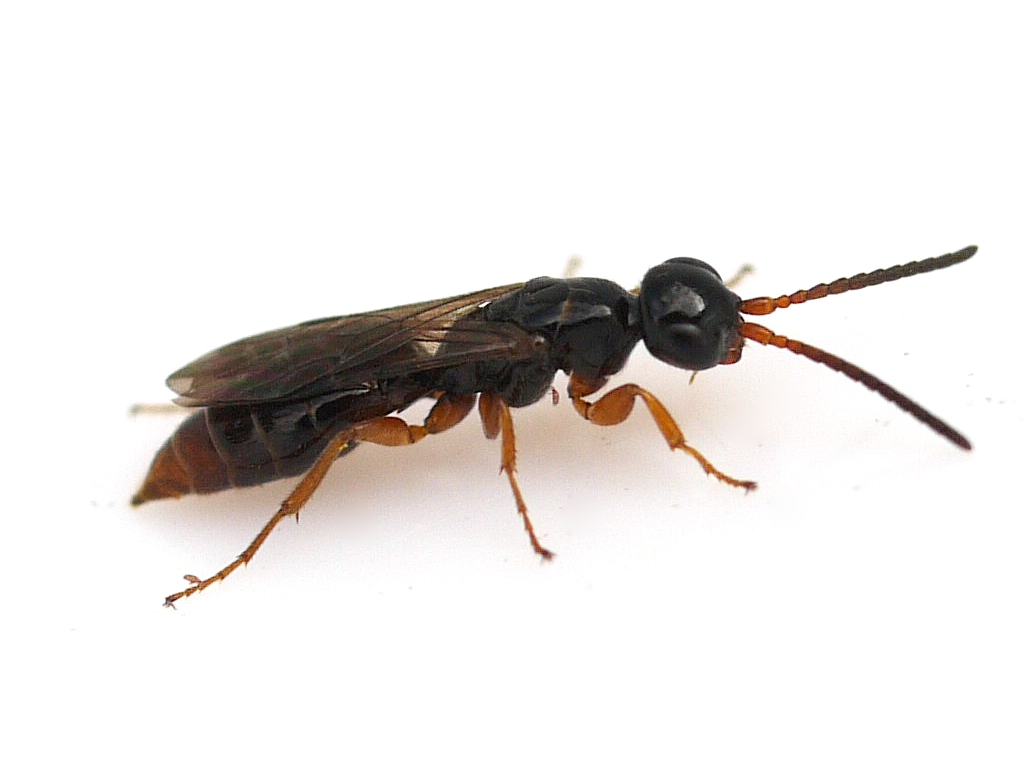
- Sierolomorpha canadensis

Scientific classification
- Domain: Eukaryota
- Kingdom: Animalia
- Phylum: Arthropoda
- Class: Insecta
- Order: Hymenoptera
- Suborder: Apocrita
- Infraorder: Aculeata
- Superfamily: Tiphioidea; Ashmead, 1903
- Family: Sierolomorphidae; Brues & Melander, 1932

Genera
- Sierolomorpha; Proscleroderma; †Loreisomorpha

= Sierolomorphidae =

Family of wasps

The Sierolomorphidae are a family of 13 extant species of wasps, in the genera Sierolomorpha and Proscleroderma, mostly found in the Northern Hemisphere. They are rare and very little is known of their biology. A fossil species Loreisomorpha nascimbenei has also been placed in the family.

The coxa (basal segment of the leg) of the hind and midlegs are next to each other, and the hindwing does not have claval or jugal lobes. The first metasomal segment does not have a true node, but can appear like that of the ants. The metasomal sternum of the first segment is separated from the second by a constriction. Sexual dimorphism varies among species from slight to marked, with both males and females having wings, but females are sometimes wingless. Adults are predominantly dark brown or black in colour. They are solitary and the larvae are suspected to be ectoparasitoids of other insects.

== Diversity ==
There are 13 known living species with 5 from the Palaearctic Region; 7 from North and Central America; and 1 from Hawaii. Species include:

=== Extant taxa ===
- Proscleroderma punctatum Kieffer 1906 (from Syria)
- Sierolomorpha apache Evans, 1961 (N. America)
- Sierolomorpha atropos Nagy, 1971 (Mongolia, Eastern Russia)
- Sierolomorpha barri Miller, 1986 (N. America)
- Sierolomorpha bicolor Evans, 1961 (N. America)
- Sierolomorpha brevicornis Evans, 1961 (N. America)
- Sierolomorpha canadensis (Provancher, 1888) (N. America)
- Sierolomorpha hospes Perkins, 1910 (Hawaii)
- Sierolomorpha isis Nagy, 1971 (Uzbekistan)
- Sierolomorpha nigrescens Evans, 1961 (N. America)
- Sierolomorpha similis Evans, 1961 (N. America)
- Sierolomorpha sogdiana Lelej & Mokrousov (from Uzbekistan)
- Sierolomorpha trjapitzini Mokrousov & Lelej, 2018 (from Eastern Russia)

=== Extinct taxa ===
- † Loreisomorpha nascimbenei Rasnitsyn, 2000 (Described from Late Cretaceous amber of New Jersey)
