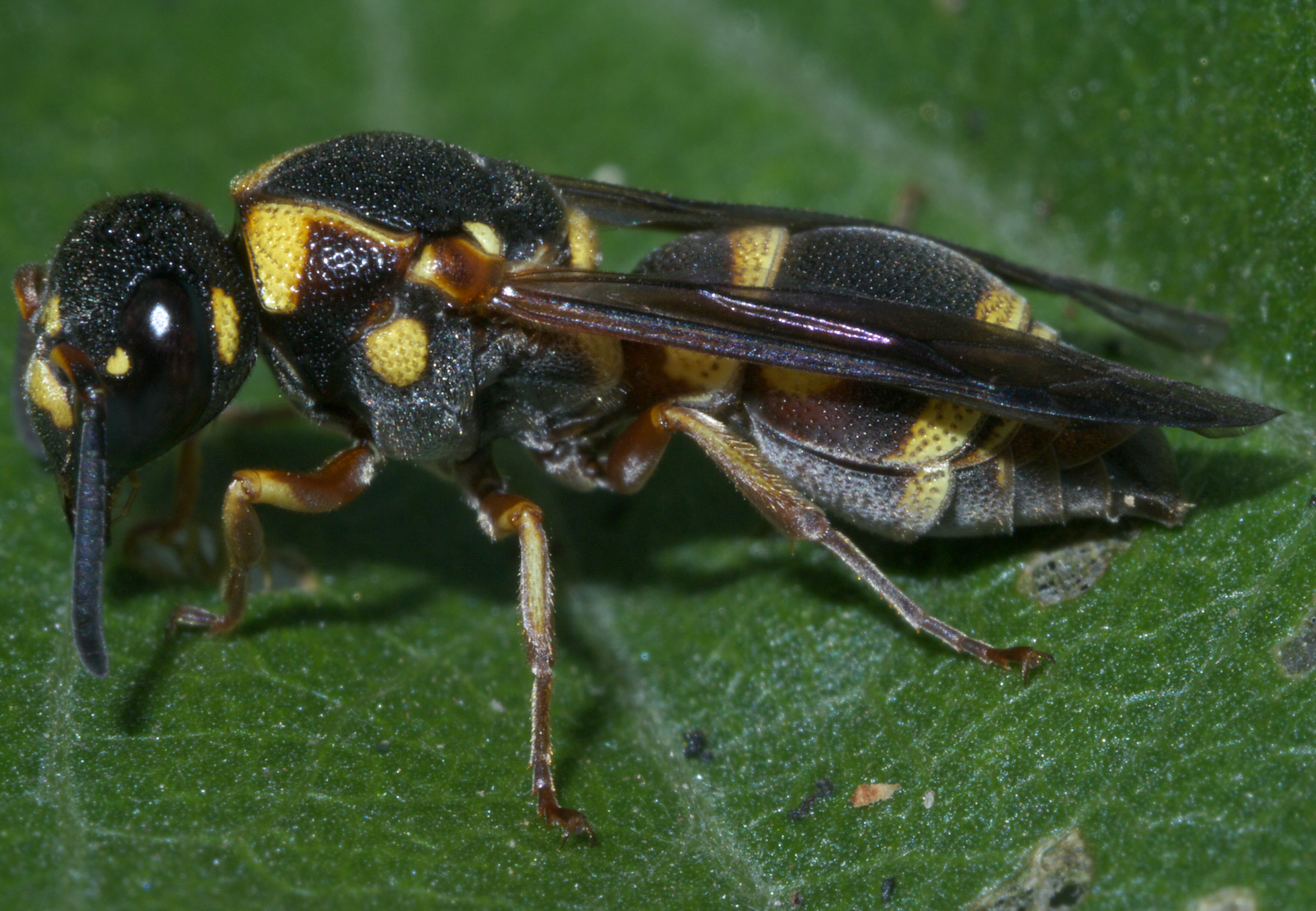

Scientific classification
- Domain: Eukaryota
- Kingdom: Animalia
- Phylum: Arthropoda
- Class: Insecta
- Order: Hymenoptera
- Family: Vespidae
- Subfamily: Eumeninae
- Genus: Stenodynerus; Saussure, 1863

Type species
- Stenodynerus chinensis (Saussure, 1863)

= Stenodynerus =

Genus of wasps

Stenodynerus is a rather large genus of potter wasps whose distribution spans the Nearctic, Palearctic, Oriental and Neotropical regions. Most of its species lack a transverse carina on the first metasomal tergum. A pair of medial pits on the anterior face of the pronotum and the expansion of the tegulae put this genus close to genera as Parancistrocerus, Hypancistrocerus and Eustenancistrocerus.

== Species ==
- Stenodynerus abactus (Brethes)
- Stenodynerus accinctus Bohart
- Stenodynerus aequisculptus (Kostylev)
- Stenodynerus ameghinoi Brethes
- Stenodynerus ammonia (Saussure)
- Stenodynerus anatropus Bohart
- Stenodynerus anormiformis (Viereck)
- Stenodynerus anormis (Say)
- Stenodynerus apache Bohart
- Stenodynerus ascerbius Bohart
- Stenodynerus assumptionis (Brèthes)
- Stenodynerus australis (Roberts)
- Stenodynerus baronii Giordani Soika
- Stenodynerus beameri Bohart
- Stenodynerus bermudensis (Bequaert)
- Stenodynerus bicolor Giordani Soika
- Stenodynerus blandoides Bohart
- Stenodynerus blandus (Saussure)
- Stenodynerus blepharus Bohart
- Stenodynerus bluethgeni Vecht
- Stenodynerus brevis Giordani Soika
- Stenodynerus canus Bohart
- Stenodynerus charanthis Bohart
- Stenodynerus chevrieranus Saussure
- Stenodynerus chinensis (Saussure)
- Stenodynerus chisosensis Bohart
- Stenodynerus chitgarensis Giordani Soika
- Stenodynerus claremontenis (Cameron)
- Stenodynerus claviger Gusenleitner
- Stenodynerus clypeopictus Kostylev
- Stenodynerus cochisensis (Viereck)
- Stenodynerus columbaris (Saussure)
- Stenodynerus coniodes Bohart
- Stenodynerus convolutus (Fox)
- Stenodynerus copiosus Gusenleitner, 2012
- Stenodynerus corallineipes (Zavattari)
- Stenodynerus coreanus Tsuneki
- Stenodynerus coyotus (Saussure)
- Stenodynerus cyphosus (Zavattari)
- Stenodynerus cyrus Gusenleitner, 2012
- Stenodynerus dentisquama (Thomson)
- Stenodynerus difficilis (Morawitz)
- Stenodynerus ectonis Bohart
- Stenodynerus epagogus Bohart
- Stenodynerus farias (Saussure)
- Stenodynerus fastidiosissimus (de Saussure)
- Stenodynerus foveolatus (Brèthes)
- Stenodynerus foxensis Bohart
- Stenodynerus frauenfeldi (Saussure)
- Stenodynerus fundatiformis (Roberts)
- Stenodynerus funebris (E. André)
- Stenodynerus giacomellii (Bertoni)
- Stenodynerus guzmani (Saussure)
- Stenodynerus haladaorum Gusenleitner
- Stenodynerus henrici (Brèthes)
- Stenodynerus heptneri (Kostylev)
- Stenodynerus histrionalis (Roberts)
- Stenodynerus hoferi Bohart
- Stenodynerus huastecus (Saussure)
- Stenodynerus hybogaster Bohart
- Stenodynerus ignotus Giordani Soika, 1994
- Stenodynerus inca (Saussure)
- Stenodynerus incurvitus Gusenleitner
- Stenodynerus indicus Gusenleitner, 2006
- Stenodynerus innobilis Bohart
- Stenodynerus iolans (Cameron)
- Stenodynerus jurinei (Saussure)
- Stenodynerus kaszabi Giordani Soika
- Stenodynerus kazakhstanicus Gusenleitner, 2001
- Stenodynerus kennicottianus (Saussure)
- Stenodynerus krombeini Bohart
- Stenodynerus kurzenkoi Gusenleitner
- Stenodynerus kusigematii Yamane & Gusenleitner
- Stenodynerus laborans (Costa)
- Stenodynerus lacetanicus (Blüthgen)
- Stenodynerus laetus Giordani Soika
- Stenodynerus laticinctus Schulthess
- Stenodynerus licinus Bohart
- Stenodynerus lindemanni (Cameron)
- Stenodynerus lineatifrons Bohart
- Stenodynerus lissolobus Bohart
- Stenodynerus lixovestis Bohart
- Stenodynerus lombokensis Selis
- Stenodynerus lucidus (Rohwer)
- Stenodynerus maculicornis Bohart
- Stenodynerus malayanus Giordani Soika
- Stenodynerus marii Brethes
- Stenodynerus maximus (Schrottky)
- Stenodynerus maya (Saussure)
- Stenodynerus mayorum Bohart
- Stenodynerus mendicus Brethes
- Stenodynerus microstictus (Viereck)
- Stenodynerus microsynoeca (Schrottky)
- Stenodynerus mimeticus (Berthold)
- Stenodynerus mimulus (Zavattari)
- Stenodynerus monotuberculatus Giordani Soika
- Stenodynerus montanus Selis
- Stenodynerus montevidensis (Brethes)
- Stenodynerus morawitzi Kurzenko
- Stenodynerus morbillosus Giordani Soika
- Stenodynerus muelleri (Dusmet)
- Stenodynerus multicavus Bohart
- Stenodynerus neotomitus Bohart
- Stenodynerus nepalensis Giordani Soika
- Stenodynerus ninglangensis Ma & Li, 2016
- Stenodynerus noticeps Bohart
- Stenodynerus nudus (Moravitz)
- Stenodynerus occidentalis (Saussure)
- Stenodynerus ochrogonius Bohart
- Stenodynerus oculeus (Roberts)
- Stenodynerus oehlkei Gusenleitner, 2008
- Stenodynerus ogasawaraensis Yamane & Gusenleitner
- Stenodynerus opalinus Bohart
- Stenodynerus orenburgensis André
- Stenodynerus otomitus (Saussure)
- Stenodynerus painteri Bohart
- Stenodynerus pannosus Gusenleitner
- Stenodynerus papagorum (Viereck)
- Stenodynerus pappi Giordani Soika
- Stenodynerus patagoniensis Bohart
- Stenodynerus patagonus Brethes
- Stenodynerus pavidus (Kohl)
- Stenodynerus peninsularis Giordani Soika
- Stenodynerus perblandus Bohart
- Stenodynerus percampanulatus (Viereck)
- Stenodynerus peyroti (Saussure)
- Stenodynerus picticrus Thomson
- Stenodynerus platensis (Brethes)
- Stenodynerus proquinquus (Saussure)
- Stenodynerus pulchellus (Saussure)
- Stenodynerus pullus Gusenleitner
- Stenodynerus pulvinatus Bohart
- Stenodynerus pulvivestis Bohart
- Stenodynerus punctifrons Thomson
- Stenodynerus punjabensis Qasim, Carpenter & Rafi, 2018
- Stenodynerus reflexus Ma & Li, 2016
- Stenodynerus rossicus Fateryga & Kochetkov, 2020
- Stenodynerus rudus Bohart
- Stenodynerus rufescens Giordani Soika
- Stenodynerus rufipes Gusenleitner
- Stenodynerus rufomaculatus Yamane & Gusenleitner
- Stenodynerus sapidus Giordani Soika
- Stenodynerus scabriusculus (Spinola)
- Stenodynerus scapulatus (Zavattari)
- Stenodynerus schrottkyi (Brethes)
- Stenodynerus securus Gusenleitner, 2004
- Stenodynerus similibaronii Ma & Li, 2016
- Stenodynerus similoides Bohart
- Stenodynerus simulatus Gusenleitner
- Stenodynerus sonoitensis Bohart
- Stenodynerus spinifer (Saussure)
- Stenodynerus steckianus Schulthess
- Stenodynerus strigatus Ma & Li, 2016
- Stenodynerus suffusus (Fox)
- Stenodynerus superpendentis Bohart
- Stenodynerus taiwanus Kim & Yamane, 2006
- Stenodynerus taos (Cresson)
- Stenodynerus taosoides Bohart
- Stenodynerus tapanecus (Saussure)
- Stenodynerus taro Barrera-Medina, 2013
- Stenodynerus temoris Bohart
- Stenodynerus tenuilamellatus Ma & Li, 2016
- Stenodynerus terebrator (Bertoni)
- Stenodynerus tergitus Kim
- Stenodynerus tokyanus (Kostylev)
- Stenodynerus topolo Bohart
- Stenodynerus trepidus (Zavattari)
- Stenodynerus trotzinai (Moravitz)
- Stenodynerus undiformis Bohart
- Stenodynerus valliceps Bohart
- Stenodynerus ventones (Cameron)
- Stenodynerus victoria (Saussure)
- Stenodynerus vivax (Zavattari)
- Stenodynerus xanthianus (Saussure)
- Stenodynerus xanthomelas Herrich-Schäffer
