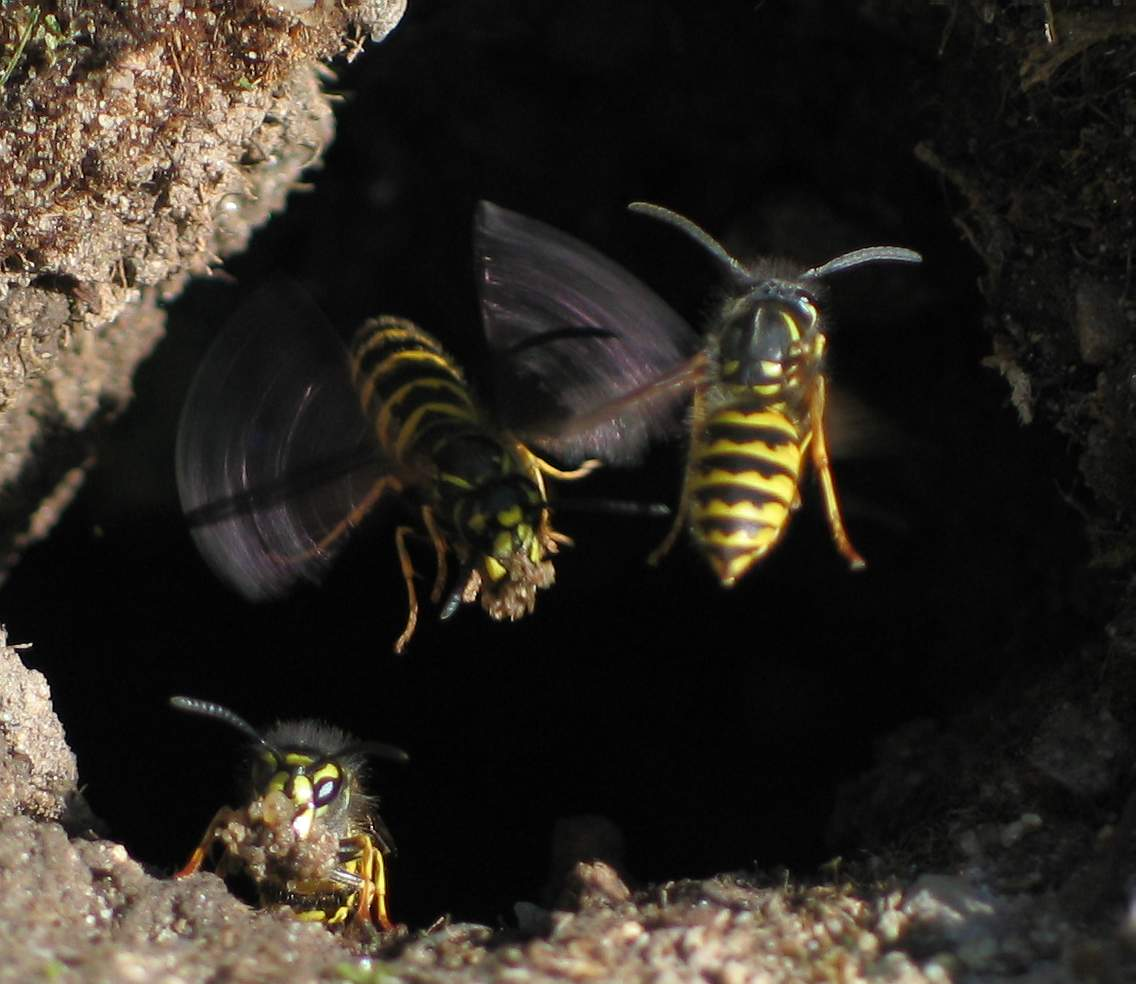
- Vespula vulgaris

Scientific classification
- Kingdom: Animalia
- Phylum: Arthropoda
- Clade: Pancrustacea
- Class: Insecta
- Order: Hymenoptera
- Suborder: Apocrita
- Infraorder: Aculeata (but see text)

Superfamilies
- Apoidea; Chrysidoidea; Formicoidea; Pompiloidea; Scolioidea; Tiphioidea; Thynnoidea; Vespoidea

= Aculeata =

Aculeata Temporal range: Late Jurassic–Recent

Infraorder of insects

Aculeata is an infraorder of Hymenoptera containing ants, bees, and stinging wasps. The name is a reference to the defining feature of the group, which is the modification of the ovipositor into a stinger. However, many members of the group cannot sting, either retaining the ovipositor, or having lost it altogether. A large part of the clade is parasitic.

This group includes all of the eusocial Hymenopterans.

The oldest aculeates are known from the Late Jurassic Karabastau Formation of Kazakhstan, represented by the family Bethylonymidae, which may be para- or polyphyletic.

== Classification ==
The use of the name Aculeata has a long history at the rank of infraorder or division. The Aculeata are a monophyletic, or good natural group, containing all the descendants of a single common ancestor. The Aculeata are therefore maintained as a taxon, either at infraorder or division rank or as an unranked clade.

- Hymenoptera
  - Sawflies
  - parasitoidism
    - Orussoidea (wood wasps)
    - Apocrita wasp waist
      - Stephanoidea
      - - Ichneumonoidea
        - - Proctotrupomorpha
          - Aculeata stinger
            - Chrysidoidea (jewel wasps)
            - - Vespoidea (yellowjackets, paper wasps, hornets)
              - - - Pompiloidea
                  - - Thynnoidea
                    - Tiphioidea
                - - Scolioidea
                  - - Formicoidea (ants)
                    - Apoidea (bees and sphecoid wasps)
