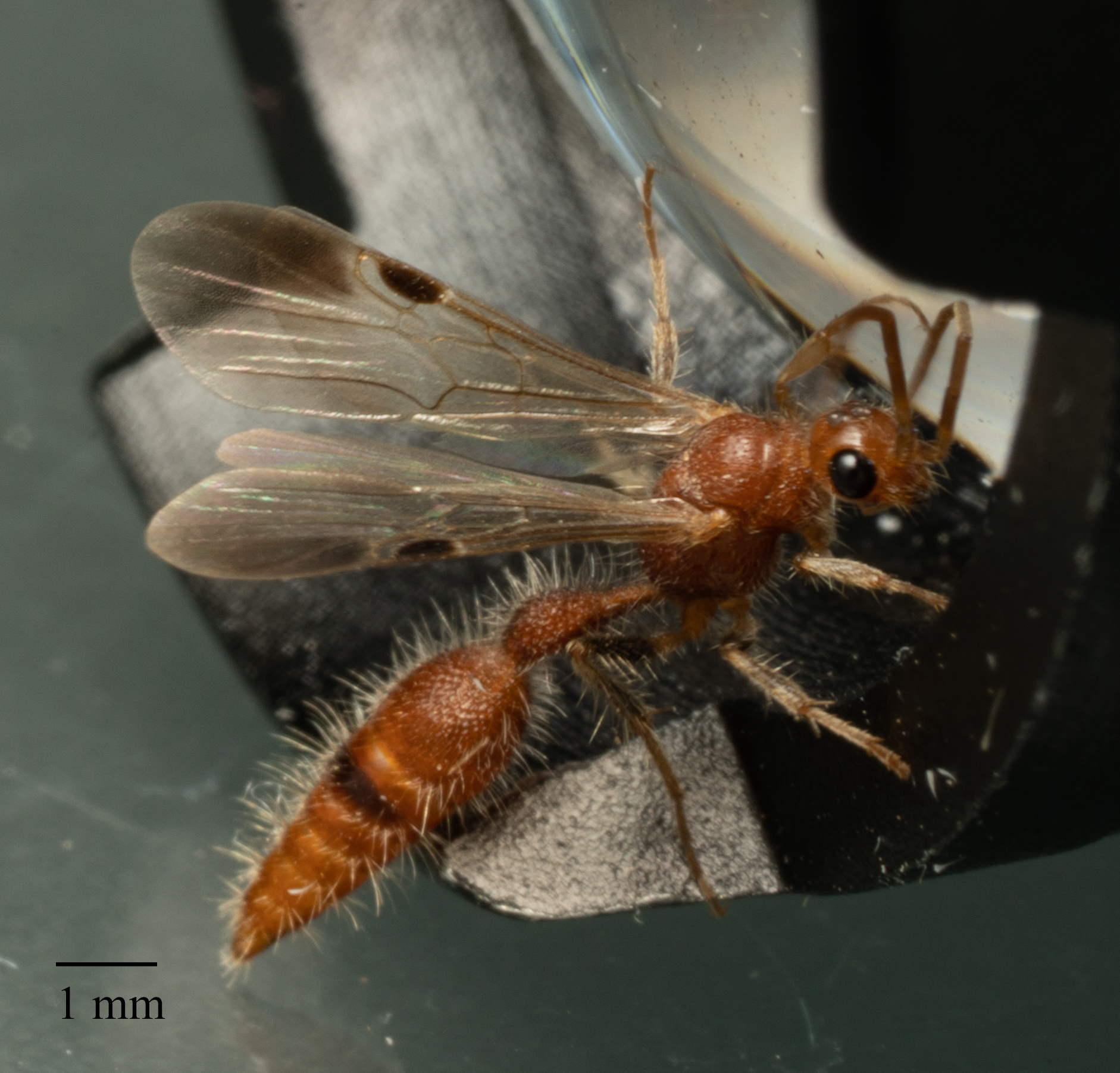
- male of Chyphotes belfragei, New Mexico

Scientific classification
- Kingdom: Animalia
- Phylum: Arthropoda
- Clade: Pancrustacea
- Class: Insecta
- Order: Hymenoptera
- Family: Chyphotidae
- Subfamily: Chyphotinae
- Genus: Chyphotes; Blake, 1886

= Chyphotes =

Genus of wasps

Chyphotes is a genus of wasps in the family Chyphotidae. There are more than 50 described species in Chyphotes found in the United States and Mexico, all with wingless females. Chyphotes are nocturnal, and some males are wingless as well.

== Species ==
- Chyphotes aenigmus Mickel, 1967 (Canada, USA)
- Chyphotes albipes (Cresson, 1874) (Canada, USA)
- Chyphotes atriceps Mickel, 1967 (Mexico, USA)
- Chyphotes attenuatus Blake, 1872 (Mexico, USA)
- Chyphotes auripilus Buzicky, 1941 (USA)
- Chyphotes belfragei (Blake, 1871) (Mexico, USA)
- Chyphotes bicolor Schuster, 1945 (USA)
- Chyphotes boharti Mickel, 1967 (Mexico)
- Chyphotes bruscus Buzicky, 1941 (USA)
- Chyphotes buzickyi Mickel, 1967 (Mexico, USA)
- Chyphotes calexicensis Bradley, 1917 (Mexico, USA)
- Chyphotes californicus Baker, 1905 (Mexico, USA)
- Chyphotes capensis Mickel, 1967 (Mexico)
- Chyphotes capitatus Mickel, 1967 (USA)
- Chyphotes cooki Mickel, 1967 (USA)
- Chyphotes dubius Mickel, 1967 (Mexico, USA)
- Chyphotes elevatus Blake, 1886 (Mexico, USA)
- Chyphotes epedaphus Buzicky, 1941 (USA)
- Chyphotes evansi Mickel, 1967 (USA)
- Chyphotes fergusoni Mickel, 1967 (USA)
- Chyphotes fuscipes Mickel, 1967 (Mexico)
- Chyphotes gracilis Mickel, 1967 (Mexico, USA)
- Chyphotes heathii Melander, 1903 (USA)
- Chyphotes incredulus Mickel, 1967 (Mexico, USA)
- Chyphotes knulli Mickel, 1967 (USA)
- Chyphotes mandibularis Mickel, 1967 (USA)
- Chyphotes marginalis Mickel, 1967 (USA)
- Chyphotes melaniceps (Blake, 1886) (Mexico, USA)
- Chyphotes mexicanus Mickel, 1967 (Mexico, USA)
- Chyphotes mickeli Buzicky, 1941 (Mexico, USA)
- Chyphotes minimus Mickel, 1963 (Mexico, USA)
- Chyphotes minusculus Mickel, 1967 (Mexico, USA)
- Chyphotes mojave Pate, 1947 (USA)
- Chyphotes nevadensis Baker, 1905
- Chyphotes nitidus Mickel, 1963 (USA)
- Chyphotes nubeculus (Cresson, 1865) (Mexico, USA)
- Chyphotes pallidus Buzicky, 1941 (USA)
- Chyphotes pedunculatus Mickel, 1967 (Mexico)
- Chyphotes peninsularis Fox, 1899 (Mexico, USA)
- Chyphotes petiolatus Fox, 1899 (USA)
- Chyphotes pimus Mickel, 1967 (USA)
- Chyphotes pixus Buzicky, 1941 (USA)
- Chyphotes pueblus Mickel, 1967 (Mexico)
- Chyphotes rossi Mickel, 1967 (Mexico)
- Chyphotes rugosus Mickel, 1967 (USA)
- Chyphotes rugulosus Mickel, 1967 (USA)
- Chyphotes scitulus Mickel, 1967 (Mexico)
- Chyphotes similis Baker, 1905 (Mexico, USA)
- Chyphotes solitarius Mickel, 1967 (Mexico)
- Chyphotes sonorus Mickel, 1967 (Mexico, USA)
- Chyphotes stramineus Mickel, 1967 (Mexico, USA)
- Chyphotes subulatus Buzicky, 1941 (USA)
- Chyphotes testaceipes Fox, 1899 (USA)
- Chyphotes wasbaueri Mickel, 1967 (USA)
