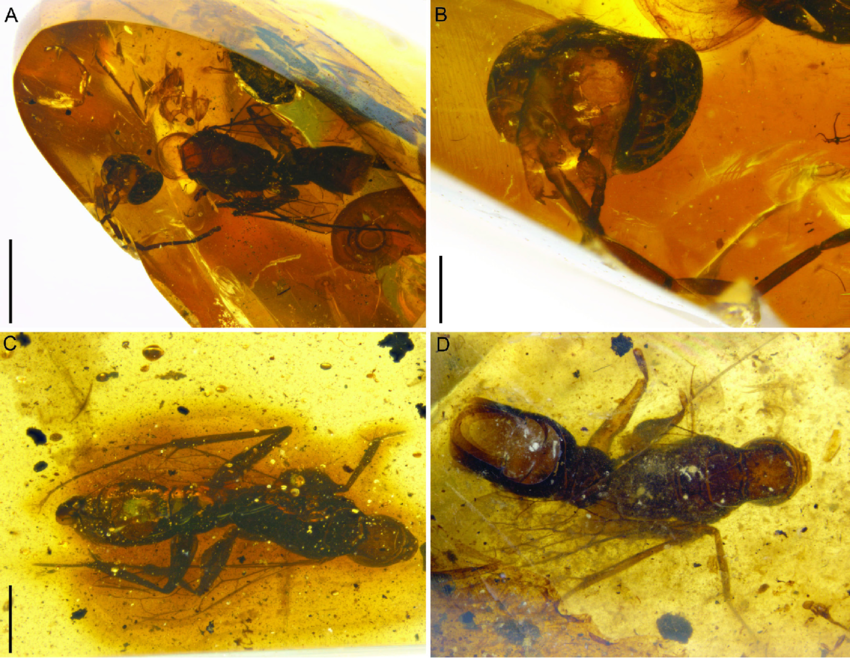
- Species-of-Rhapidogyna

Scientific classification
- Kingdom: Animalia
- Phylum: Arthropoda
- Subphylum: Chelicerata
- Class: Arachnida
- Order: Araneae
- Infraorder: Araneomorphae
- Family: Linyphiidae
- Genus: Rhabdogyna; Millidge, 1985

Type species
- R. patagonica (Tullgren, 1901)

Species
- R. chiloensis Millidge, 1985 – Chile; R. patagonica (Tullgren, 1901) – Chile

= Rhabdogyna =

Genus of spiders

Rhabdogyna is a genus of South American sheet weavers that was first described by Alfred Frank Millidge in 1985. As of May 2019 it contains only two species, both found in Chile: R. chiloensis and R. patagonica.
