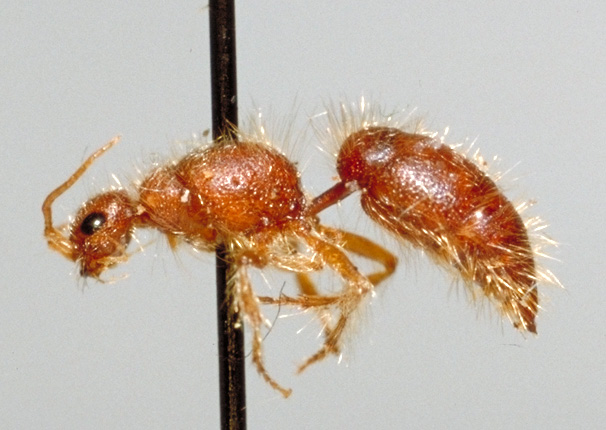
- female Chyphotes

Scientific classification
- Kingdom: Animalia
- Phylum: Arthropoda
- Clade: Pancrustacea
- Class: Insecta
- Order: Hymenoptera
- Infraorder: Aculeata
- Superfamily: Thynnoidea

= Thynnoidea =

Superfamily of insects

Thynnoidea is a superfamily of hymenopterans in the order Hymenoptera. There are 2 families and hundreds of described species in Thynnoidea.

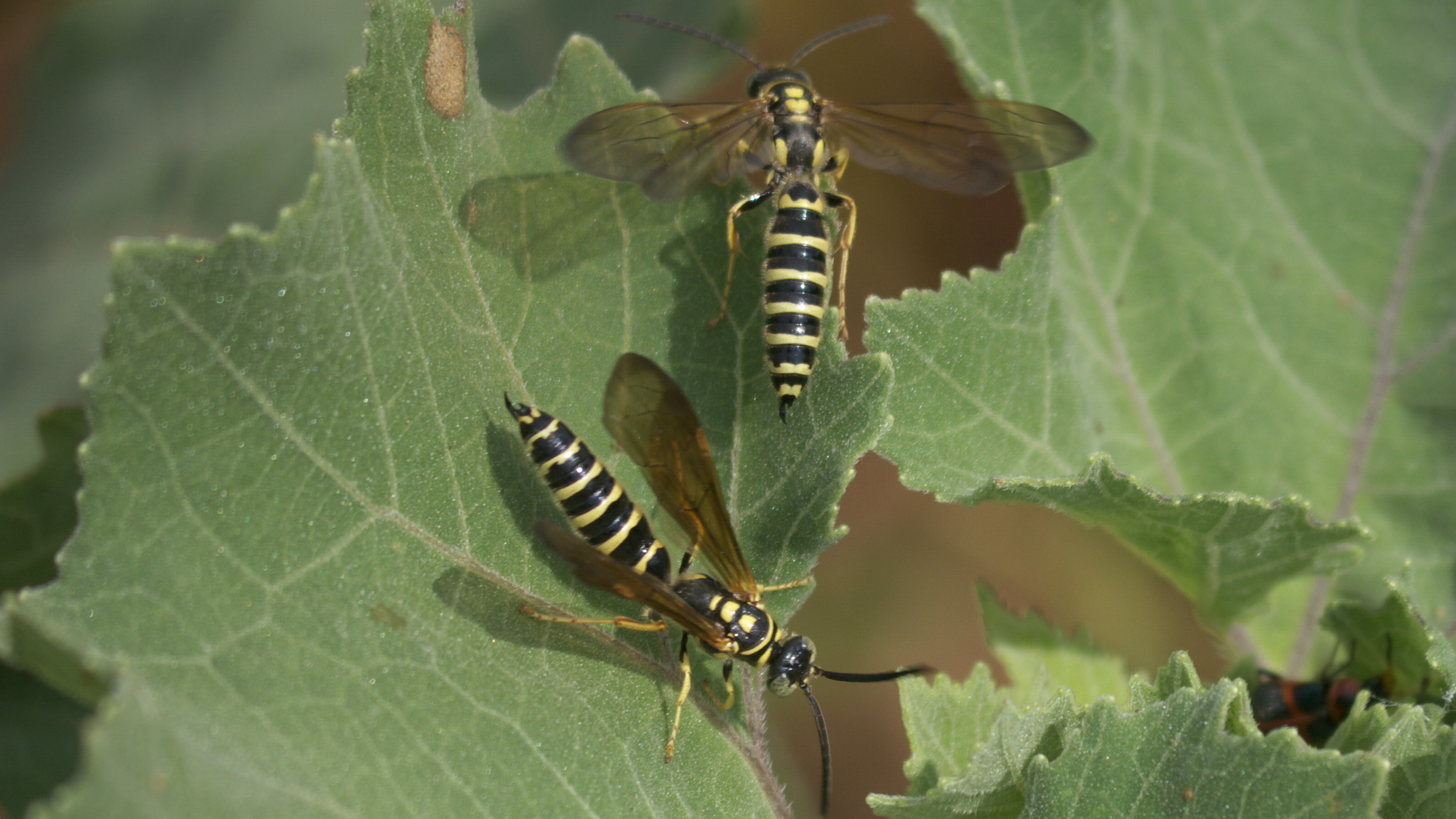
males of Myzinum quinquecinctum

== Families ==
These two families belong to the superfamily Thynnoidea:

- Chyphotidae (chyphotid wasps)
- Thynnidae (thynnid wasps)
