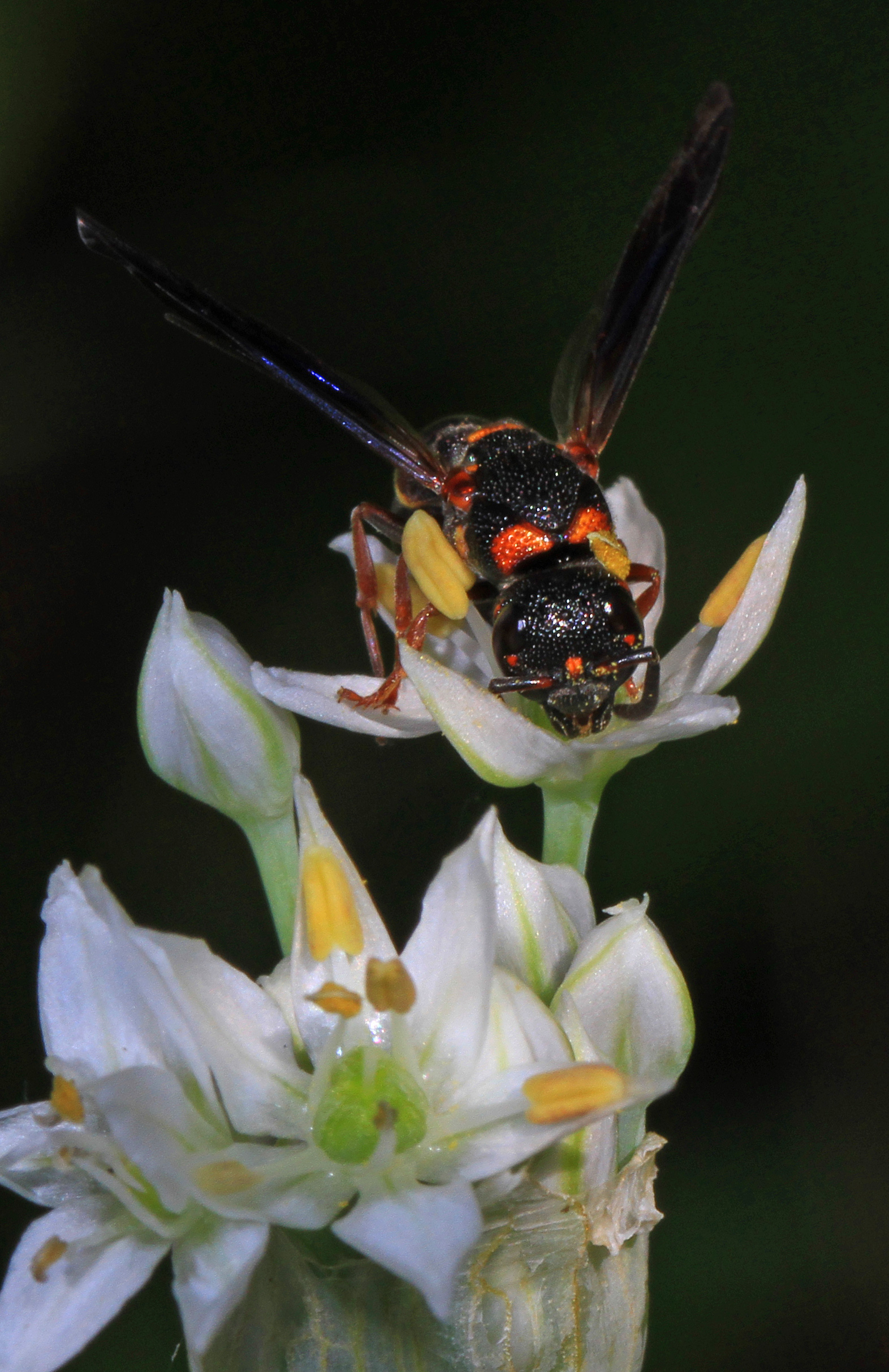
- Parancistrocerus histrio

Scientific classification
- Domain: Eukaryota
- Kingdom: Animalia
- Phylum: Arthropoda
- Class: Insecta
- Order: Hymenoptera
- Family: Vespidae
- Subfamily: Eumeninae
- Genus: Parancistrocerus; Bequaert, 1925

Type species
- Parancistrocerus fulvipes (Saussure, 1855)

= Parancistrocerus =

Genus of wasps

Parancistrocerus is a rather large genus of potter wasps whose distribution spans the Nearctic, eastern Palearctic, Oriental and Neotropical regions. A pair of medial pits on the anterior face of the pronotum and the expansion of the tegulae put this genus close to the genus Stenodynerus and many species of both genera are somewhat difficult to assignate to their respective genus.

Their species are notable for having a smooth depression acting as an acarinarium at the base of the second metasomal tergum and hidden under the first metasomal tergum. This acarinarium serves as shelter for symbiotic deutonymphs of mites in the family Winterschmidtiidae. Most of the species bear a transverse carina on the first metasomal tergum and the whole body of many neotropical species have a faint submetallic luster.

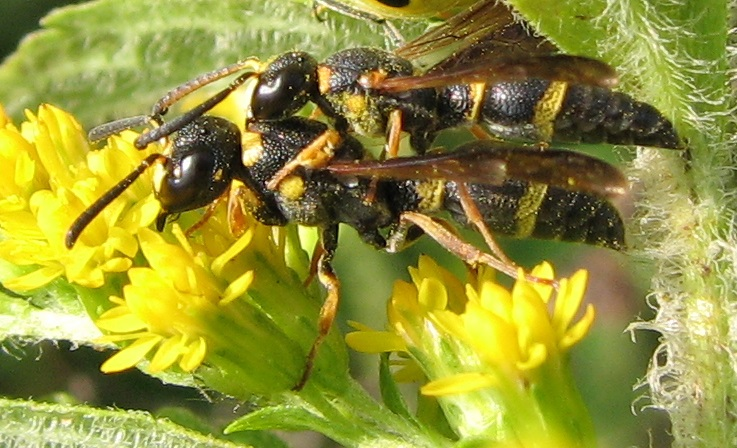
Parancistrocerus perennis mating

== See also ==
- List of Parancistrocerus species
