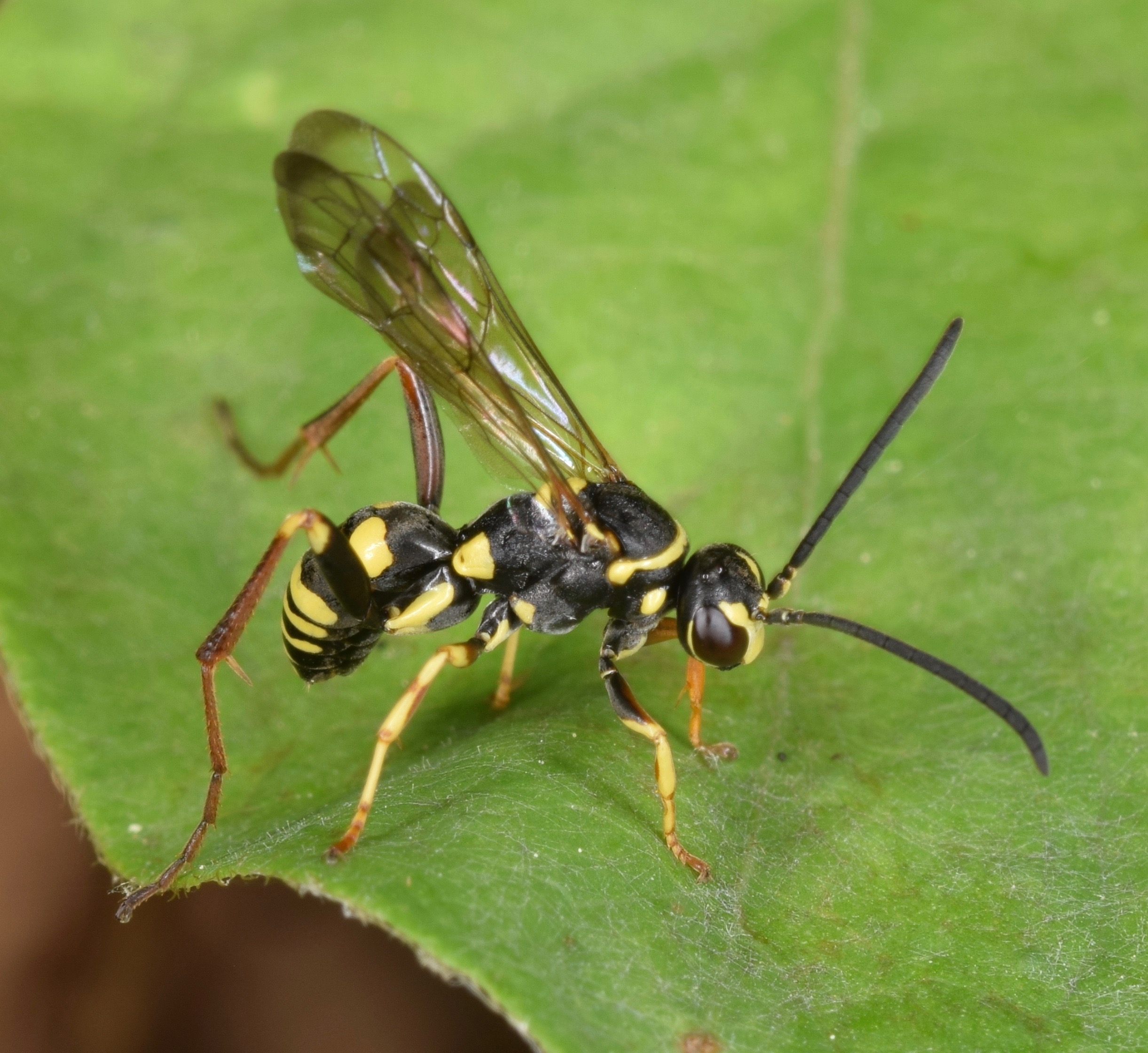
- Ceropales maculata (Pompilidae)

Scientific classification
- Kingdom: Animalia
- Phylum: Arthropoda
- Clade: Pancrustacea
- Class: Insecta
- Order: Hymenoptera
- Infraorder: Aculeata
- Superfamily: Pompiloidea

= Pompiloidea =

Superfamily of wasps

Pompiloidea is a superfamily that includes spider wasps and velvet ants, among others, in the order Hymenoptera. There are 4 extant families in Pompiloidea.

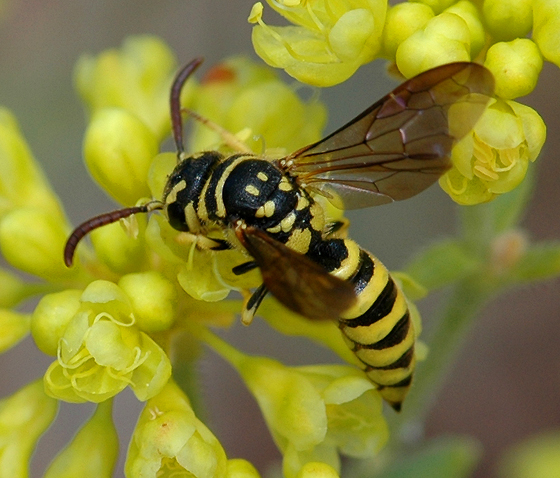
Eusapyga verticalis

== Families ==
- Mutillidae (velvet ants)
- Myrmosidae (myrmosid wasps)
- Pompilidae (spider wasps)
- Sapygidae (sapygid wasps)

The extinct family Burmusculidae, known from Cretaceous amber, is also placed here.
