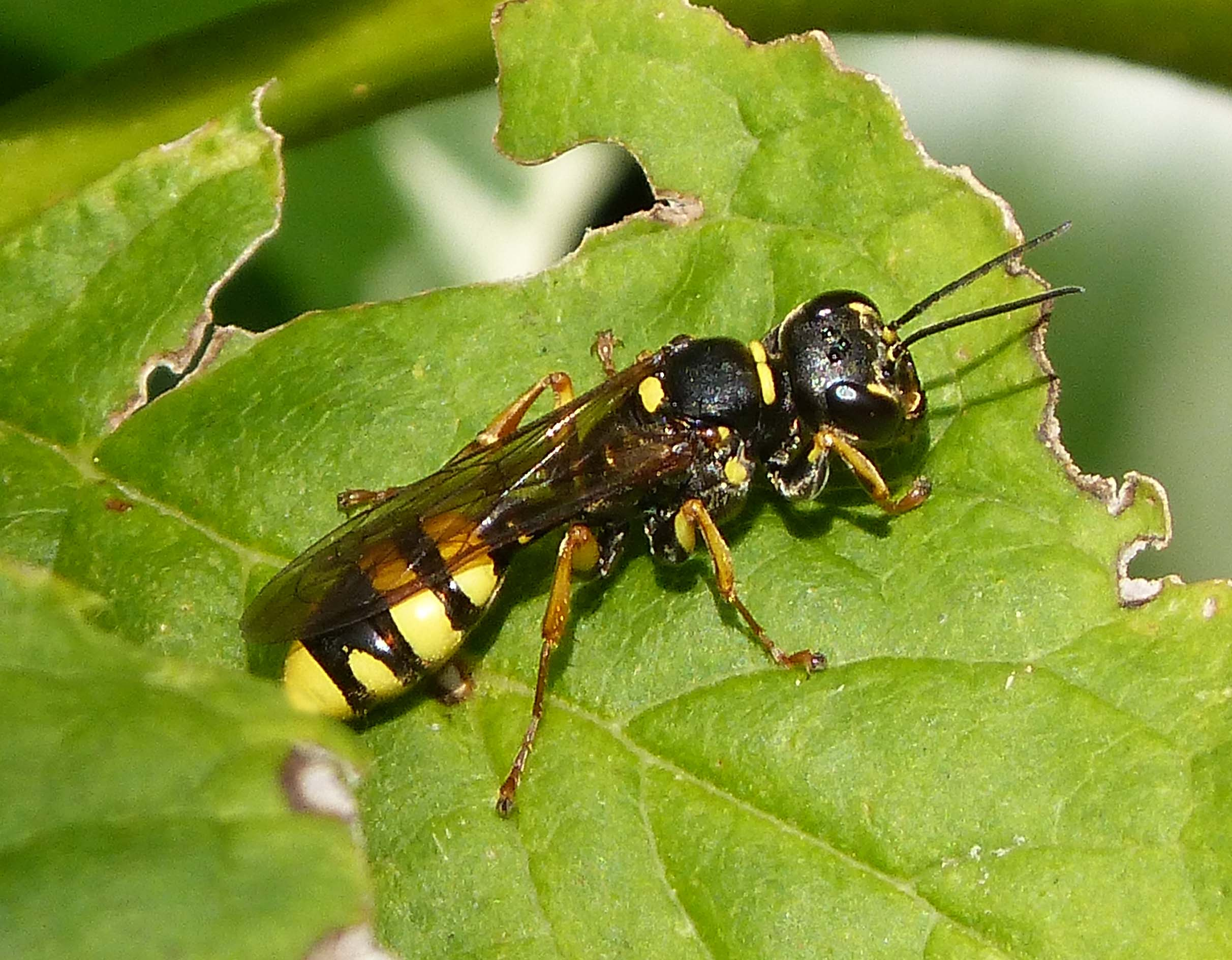
- Mellinus arvensis

Scientific classification
- Domain: Eukaryota
- Kingdom: Animalia
- Phylum: Arthropoda
- Class: Insecta
- Order: Hymenoptera
- Superfamily: Apoidea
- Family: Mellinidae; Latreille, 1802

Genera
- Mellinus; Xenosphex

= Mellinidae =

Family of wasps

Mellinidae is a small family of wasps, comprising 17 described species in two genera. These wasps are found in the Nearctic, Neotropical, Indomalayan and Palaearctic realms. This group has traditionally been treated as a subfamily within Crabronidae (Mellininae), but recent phylogenomic studies have shown it to be a distinct family.
