= Aporia (disambiguation) =

Aporia denotes, in philosophy, a philosophical puzzle or state of puzzlement, and, in rhetoric, a rhetorically useful expression of doubt.

Aporia may also refer to:

- Aporia (butterfly), a genus of pierid butterflies found in the Palearctic region
- Aporia (Forever Never album), an album by metal band Forever Never
- Aporia (Sufjan Stevens and Lowell Brams album), released in 2020
- Aporia (film), a 2023 American film starring Judy Greer
- Aporia (Fargo), an episode of the American television series Fargo
- Aporia (company), a machine learning observability platform
- Aporia, a far-right magazine published by the Human Diversity Foundation
- Aporia, an undergraduate journal that has been published by the University of St Andrews Philosophy Society
- Aporia, a synonym for a genus of wasps, Mimesa
- Aporia, a rhetorical device that is a type of rhetorical question
