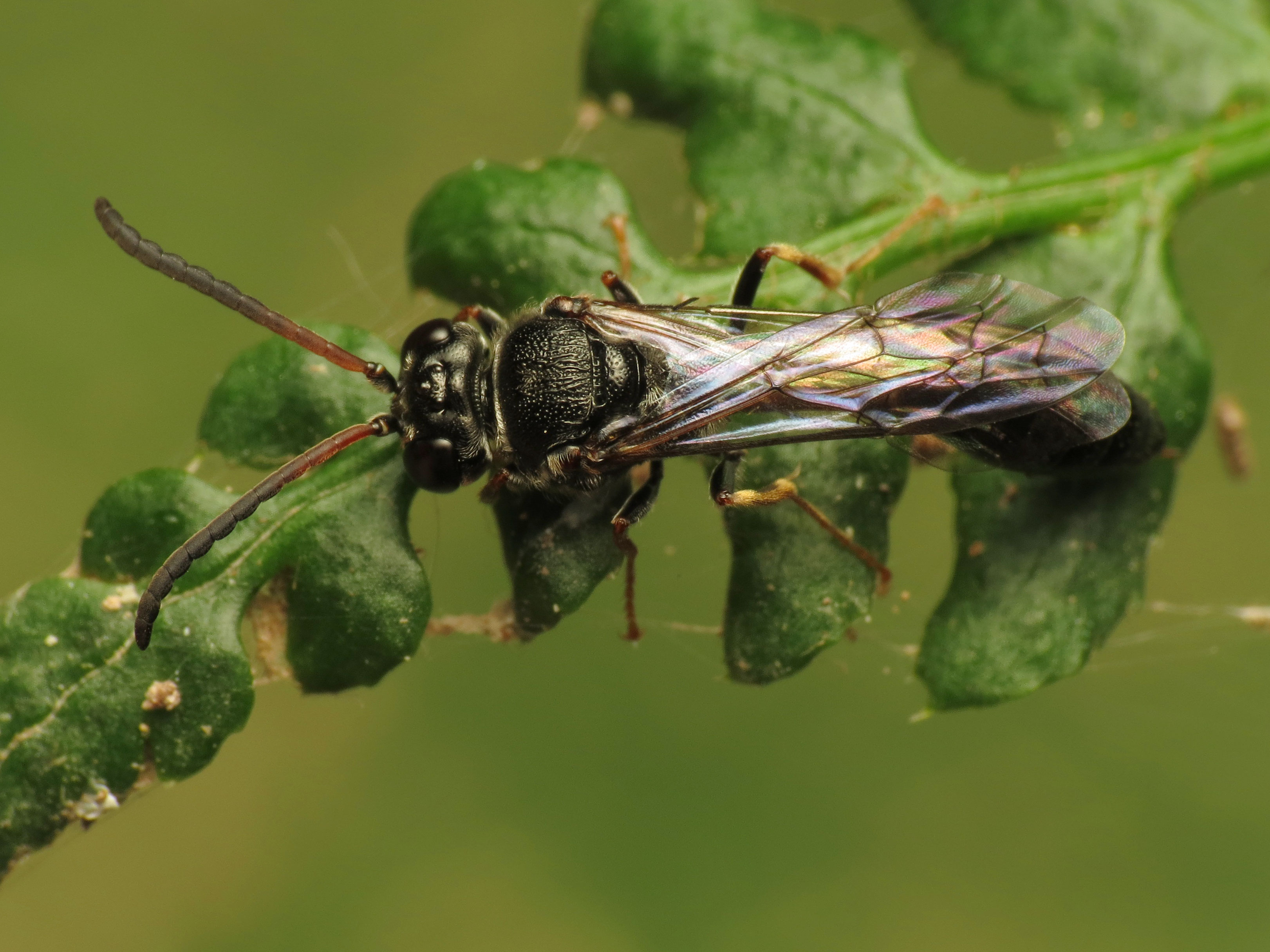

Scientific classification
- Domain: Eukaryota
- Kingdom: Animalia
- Phylum: Arthropoda
- Class: Insecta
- Order: Hymenoptera
- Family: Psenidae
- Genus: Psen
- Species: P. erythropoda

Binomial name
- Psen erythropoda Rohwer, 1910

= Psen erythropoda =

Species of wasp

Psen erythropoda is a species of aphid wasp in the family Psenidae. It is found in North America.

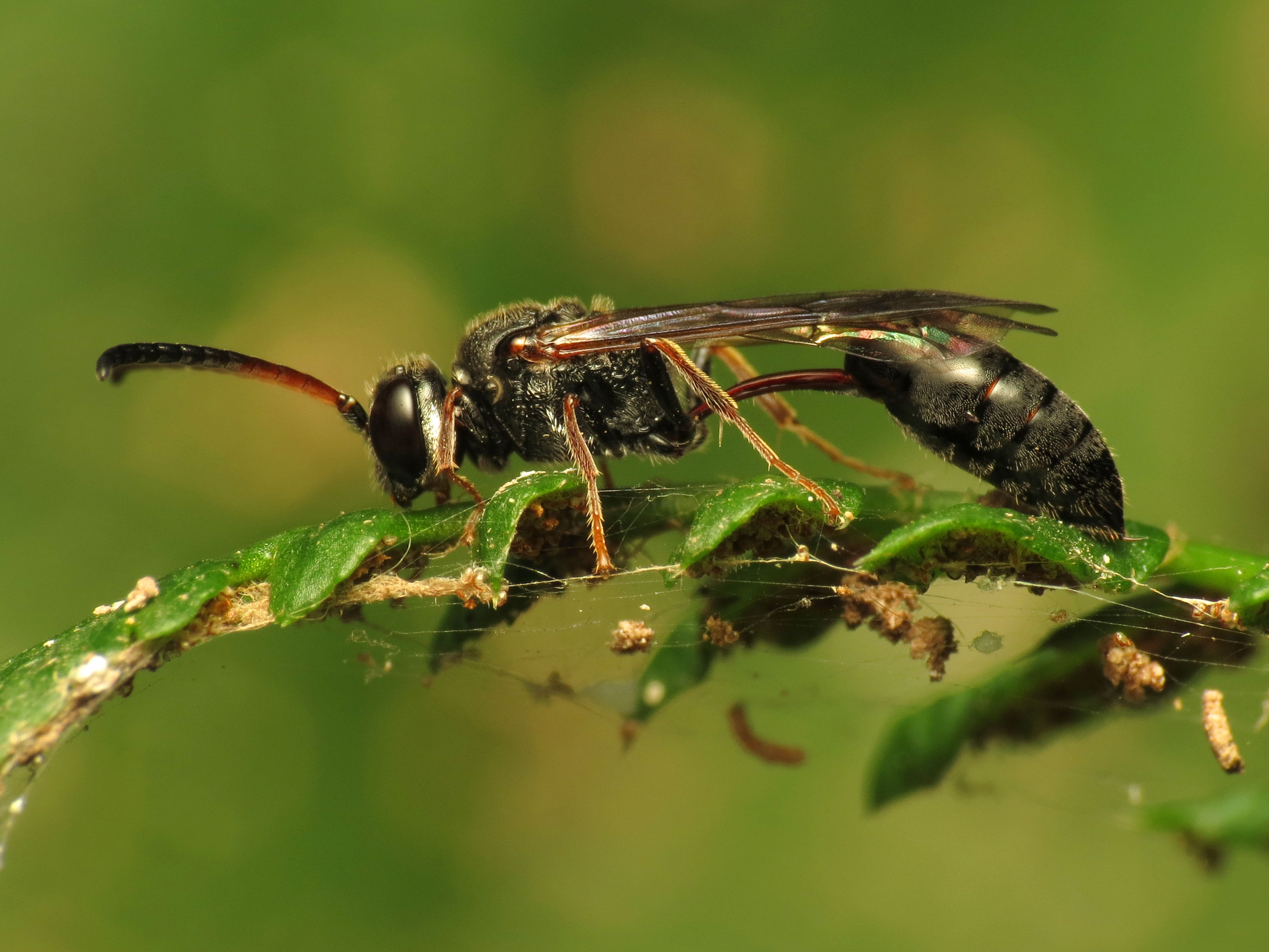
