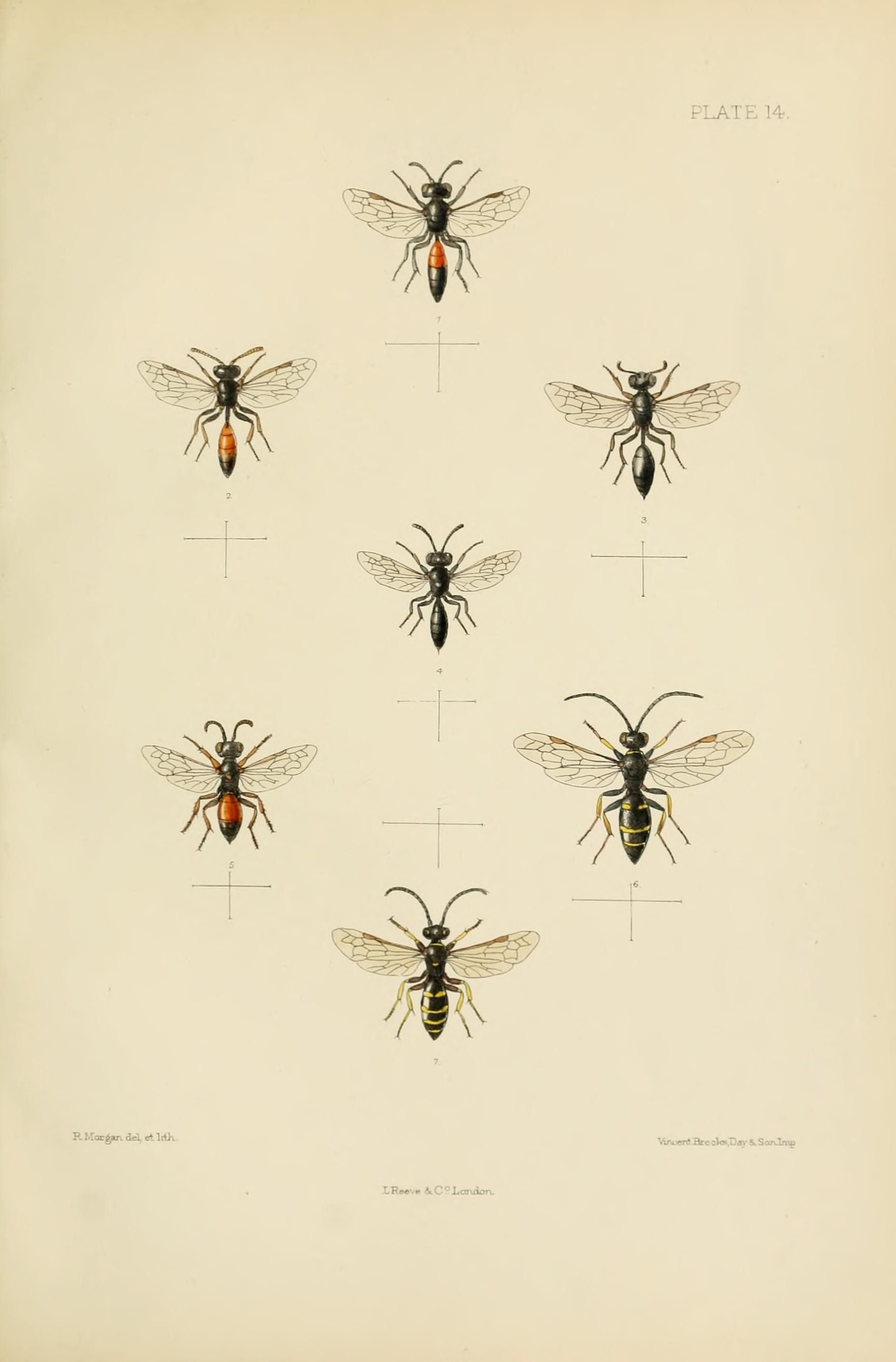
- Psenulus pallipes in Edward Saunders 1896, The Hymenoptera Aculeata of the British Isles Fig. 4

Scientific classification
- Domain: Eukaryota
- Kingdom: Animalia
- Phylum: Arthropoda
- Class: Insecta
- Order: Hymenoptera
- Superfamily: Apoidea
- Family: Psenidae
- Genus: Psenulus
- Species: P. pallipes

Binomial name
- Psenulus pallipes (Panzer, 1798)

= Psenulus pallipes =

Species of wasp

Psenulus pallipes is a Palearctic species of solitary wasp.
