= Lithium (disambiguation) =

Lithium is a chemical element with symbol Li and atomic number 3.

Lithium may also refer to:

== In science ==
- Lithium (medication), mood-stabilizing drugs
- Lithium (wasp), a genus of wasps
- Lithium-ion battery, a battery used in electronics

== In music ==
- "Lithium" (Nirvana song), a 1991 single from Nirvana's second album, Nevermind
- "Lithium" (Evanescence song), a song from Evanescence's 2006 album, The Open Door
- Lithium (Sirius XM), also known as Lithium 34, a 1990s alternative music station offered by SIRIUS Satellite Radio
- Lithium (label), a defunct indie-rock French label

== Other ==
- Lithium Technologies, an online customer support and brand loyalty company
- Lithium, Missouri, a village in the United States
- Lithium (PHP framework), a PHP framework inspired and staffed by some members of the CakePHP project

== See also ==
- Li (disambiguation)
- Isotopes of lithium
