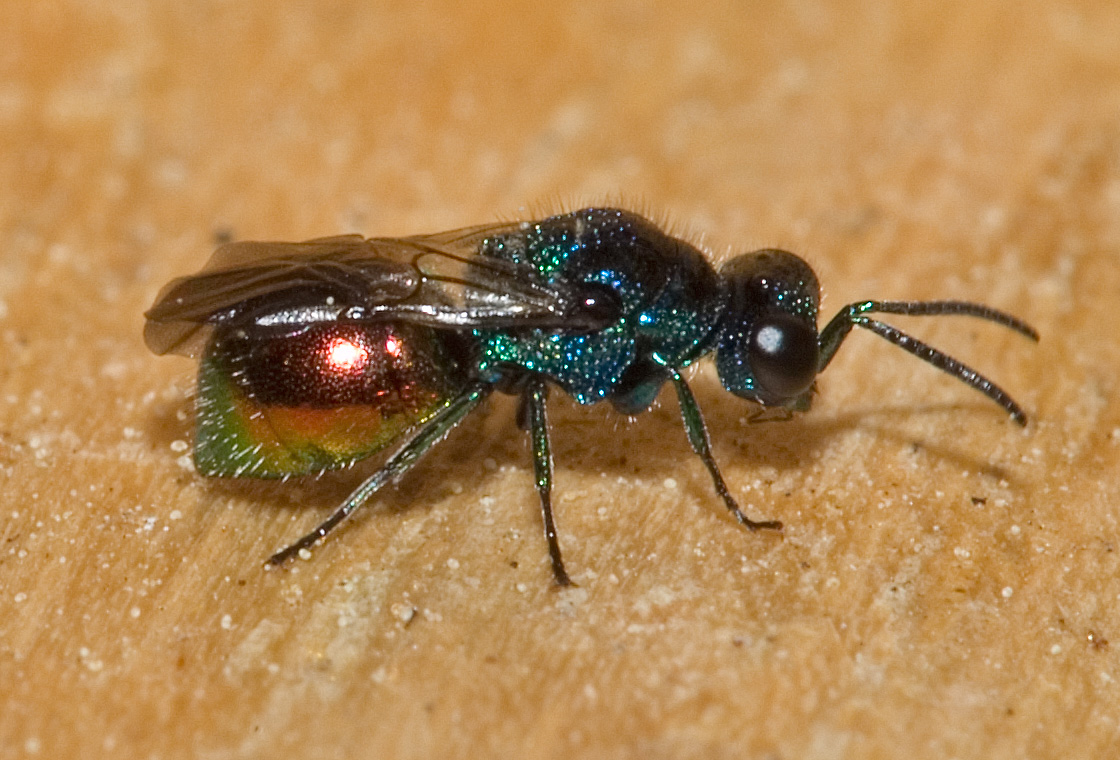
- A live individual of Pseudomalus auratus
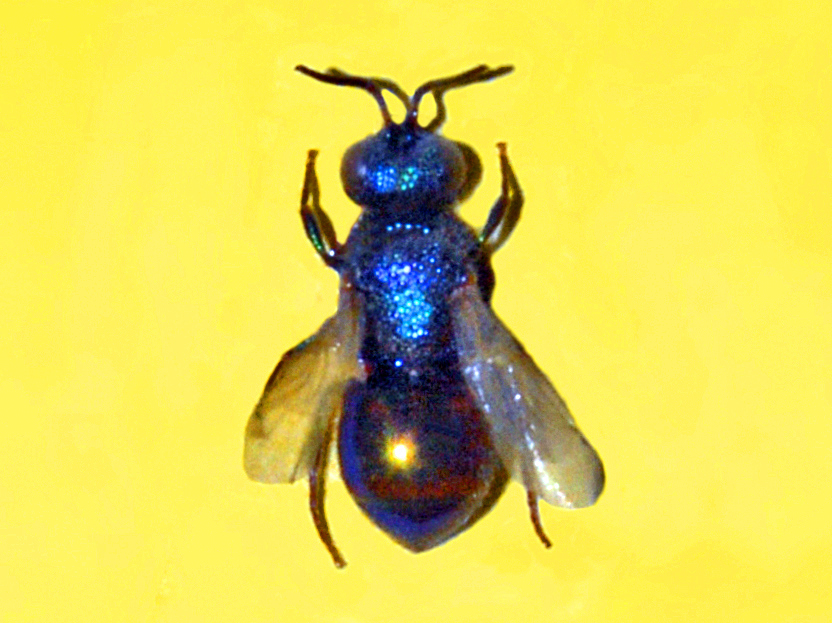
- Pseudomalus auratus. Museum specimen

Scientific classification
- Kingdom: Animalia
- Phylum: Arthropoda
- Class: Insecta
- Order: Hymenoptera
- Family: Chrysididae
- Genus: Pseudomalus
- Species: P. auratus

Binomial name
- Pseudomalus auratus (Linnaeus, 1758)

Synonyms
- Chrysis auratus; Omalus auratus (Linnaeus, 1761)

= Pseudomalus auratus =

Species of wasp

Pseudomalus auratus is a species of cuckoo wasp (insects in the family Chrysididae).

== Description ==
Pseudomalus auratus can reach a length of 3–7 millimetres (0.12–0.28 in). Head and thorax of these little wasps are metallic bluish, while the abdomen is reddish. Head and thorax are hairy.

== Biology ==
These wasps fly from late May to early October. They mainly parasitize hymenoptera in the Apidae family (Ceratina), Colletidae family (Hylaeus), Megachilidae family (Anthidium) and in the Crabronidae family (Pemphredon lethifera, Pemphredon unicolor, Passaloecus gracilis, Passaloecus turionum, Passaloecus brevicornis, Rhopalum coarctatum, Psenulus and Trypoxylon). Larvae mainly can be found in blackberry and raspberry branches and dead wood.

== Distribution and habitat ==
This species is present in most of Europe (UK, Norway, Sweden, Finland, Denmark, Belgium, France, Spain, Germany, Italy, Poland, Hungary, former Yugoslavia, Greece, Canary Islands, Crete and Switzerland, in the East Palearctic ecozone, in the Near East, in North Africa and in Asia (including Russia, Manchuria, Korea and Japan). These wasps inhabit open areas, forest edges and thickets where its nesting hosts can be found.

It was accidentally introduced in the United States, probably before 1828. Bugguide

== Bibliography ==
- Rolf Witt: Wespen. Beobachten, Bestimmen. Naturbuch-Verlag, Augsburg 1998, ISBN 3-89440-243-1.
