= Psen monticola =

Scientific classification
- Domain: Eukaryota
- Kingdom: Animalia
- Phylum: Arthropoda
- Class: Insecta
- Order: Hymenoptera
- Family: Psenidae
- Genus: Psen
- Species: P. monticola

Binomial name
- Psen monticola (Packard, 1867)

Synonyms
- Mimesa monticola Packard, 1867

Species of wasp

Psen monticola is a species of aphid wasp in the family Psenidae. It is found in North America.
