= Mimumesa littoralis =

Scientific classification
- Kingdom: Animalia
- Phylum: Arthropoda
- Class: Insecta
- Order: Hymenoptera
- Superfamily: Apoidea
- Family: Psenidae
- Genus: Mimumesa
- Species: M. littoralis

Binomial name
- Mimumesa littoralis (Bondroit, 1934)

Species of wasp

Mimumesa littoralis is a Palearctic species of solitary wasp.
