= Mimumesa unicolor =

Scientific classification
- Domain: Eukaryota
- Kingdom: Animalia
- Phylum: Arthropoda
- Class: Insecta
- Order: Hymenoptera
- Superfamily: Apoidea
- Family: Psenidae
- Genus: Mimumesa
- Species: M. unicolor

Binomial name
- Mimumesa unicolor (Vander Linden 1829)

Species of wasp

Mimumesa unicolor is a Palearctic species of solitary wasp.
