= Pseneo punctatus =

Scientific classification
- Domain: Eukaryota
- Kingdom: Animalia
- Phylum: Arthropoda
- Class: Insecta
- Order: Hymenoptera
- Family: Psenidae
- Genus: Pseneo
- Species: P. punctatus

Binomial name
- Pseneo punctatus (W. Fox, 1898)

Synonyms
- Psen punctatus W. Fox, 1898

Species of wasp

Pseneo punctatus is a species of aphid wasp in the family Psenidae. It is found in Central America and North America.

== Subspecies ==
These three subspecies belong to the species Pseneo punctatus:

- Pseneo punctatus carolina (Rohwer, 1910)
- Pseneo punctatus ferrugineus (Viereck, 1901)
- Pseneo punctatus punctatus (W. Fox, 1898)
