= Pluto (wasp) =

Scientific classification
- Domain: Eukaryota
- Kingdom: Animalia
- Phylum: Arthropoda
- Class: Insecta
- Order: Hymenoptera
- Family: Psenidae
- Genus: Pluto; Pate, 1937

Synonyms
- Psenia Malloch, 1933

Genus of wasps

Pluto is a genus of aphid wasps in the family Psenidae. There are at least 50 described species in Pluto.

== Species ==
These 58 species belong to the genus Pluto:

- Pluto abbreviatus van Lith, 1979^{i c g}
- Pluto aerofacies (Malloch, 1933)^{i c g}
- Pluto albifacies (Malloch, 1933)^{i c g}
- Pluto alphitopus van Lith, 1979^{i c g}
- Pluto angulicornis (Malloch, 1933)^{i c g}
- Pluto annulipes (Cameron, 1891)^{i c g}
- Pluto araguensis van Lith, 1979^{i c g}
- Pluto arenivagus Krombein, 1950^{i c g}
- Pluto argentifrons (Cresson, 1865)^{i c g}
- Pluto atricornis (Malloch, 1933)^{i c g}
- Pluto basifuscus van Lith, 1979^{i c g}
- Pluto biformis van Lith, 1979^{i c g}
- Pluto brevipetiolatus (Rohwer, 1910)^{i c g}
- Pluto castaneipes van Lith, 1979^{i c g}
- Pluto clavicornis (Malloch, 1933)^{i c g}
- Pluto colonensis van Lith, 1979^{i c g}
- Pluto denticollis van Lith, 1979^{i c g}
- Pluto depressus van Lith, 1979^{i c g}
- Pluto duckei van Lith, 1979^{i c g}
- Pluto emarginatus van Lith, 1979^{i c g}
- Pluto evansi van Lith, 1979^{i c g}
- Pluto facialis van Lith, 1979^{i c g}
- Pluto fritzi van Lith, 1979^{i c g}
- Pluto incarinatus van Lith, 1979^{i c g}
- Pluto joergenseni (Brèthes, 1913)^{i c g}
- Pluto jugularis van Lith, 1979^{i c g}
- Pluto littoralis (Malloch, 1933)^{i c g}
- Pluto longiventris (Malloch, 1933)^{i c g}
- Pluto marthae van Lith, 1979^{i c g}
- Pluto medius (F. Smith, 1856)^{i c g}
- Pluto menkei van Lith, 1979^{i c g}
- Pluto metanus van Lith, 1979^{i c g}
- Pluto minutus (Malloch, 1933)^{i c g}
- Pluto nitens van Lith, 1979^{i c g}
- Pluto obscurus van Lith, 1979^{i c g}
- Pluto occipitalis van Lith, 1979^{i c g}
- Pluto pallidistigma (Malloch, 1933)^{i c g}
- Pluto punctatellus van Lith, 1979^{i c g}
- Pluto pygmaeus (Brèthes, 1913)^{i c g}
- Pluto rotundus van Lith, 1979^{i c g}
- Pluto rufanalis van Lith, 1979^{i c g}
- Pluto rufibasis (Malloch, 1933)^{i c g}
- Pluto rugulosus van Lith, 1979^{i c g}
- Pluto sayi (Rohwer, 1910)^{i c g}
- Pluto scytinus van Lith, 1979^{i c g}
- Pluto simplicicollis van Lith, 1979^{i c g}
- Pluto smithii (W. Fox, 1897)^{i c g}
- Pluto spangleri van Lith, 1979^{i c g}
- Pluto spinicollis van Lith, 1979^{i c g}
- Pluto stenopygidialis van Lith, 1979^{i c g}
- Pluto stramineipes van Lith, 1979^{i c g}
- Pluto strigellus van Lith, 1979^{i c g}
- Pluto suffusus (W. Fox, 1898)^{i c g}
- Pluto texanus (Malloch, 1933)^{i c g}
- Pluto tibialis (Cresson, 1873)^{i c g}
- Pluto townsendi (Cockerell, 1911)^{i c g}
- Pluto trilobatus van Lith, 1979^{i c g}
- Pluto zonatus van Lith, 1979^{i c g}

Data sources: i = ITIS, c = Catalogue of Life, g = GBIF,
