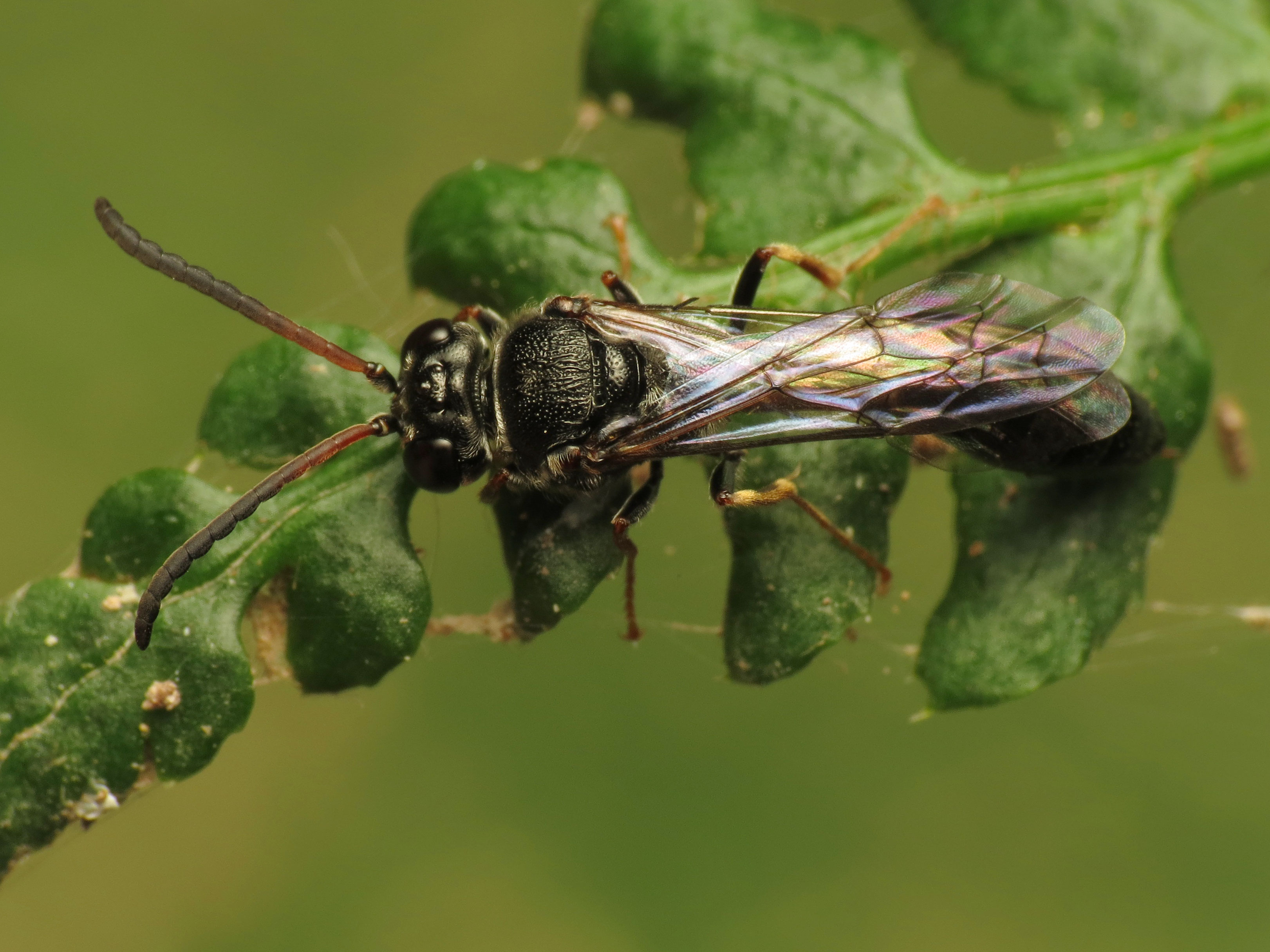
- Psen erythropoda

Scientific classification
- Kingdom: Animalia
- Phylum: Arthropoda
- Class: Insecta
- Order: Hymenoptera
- Family: Psenidae
- Genus: Psen; Latreille, 1796

Synonyms
- Caenopsen Stephens, 1829; Dahlbomia Wissmann, 1849; Mesopora Wesmael, 1852; Psenia Cameron, 1899

= Psen =

Genus of insects

Psen is a genus of aphid wasps in the family Psenidae. There are at least 90 described species in Psen.

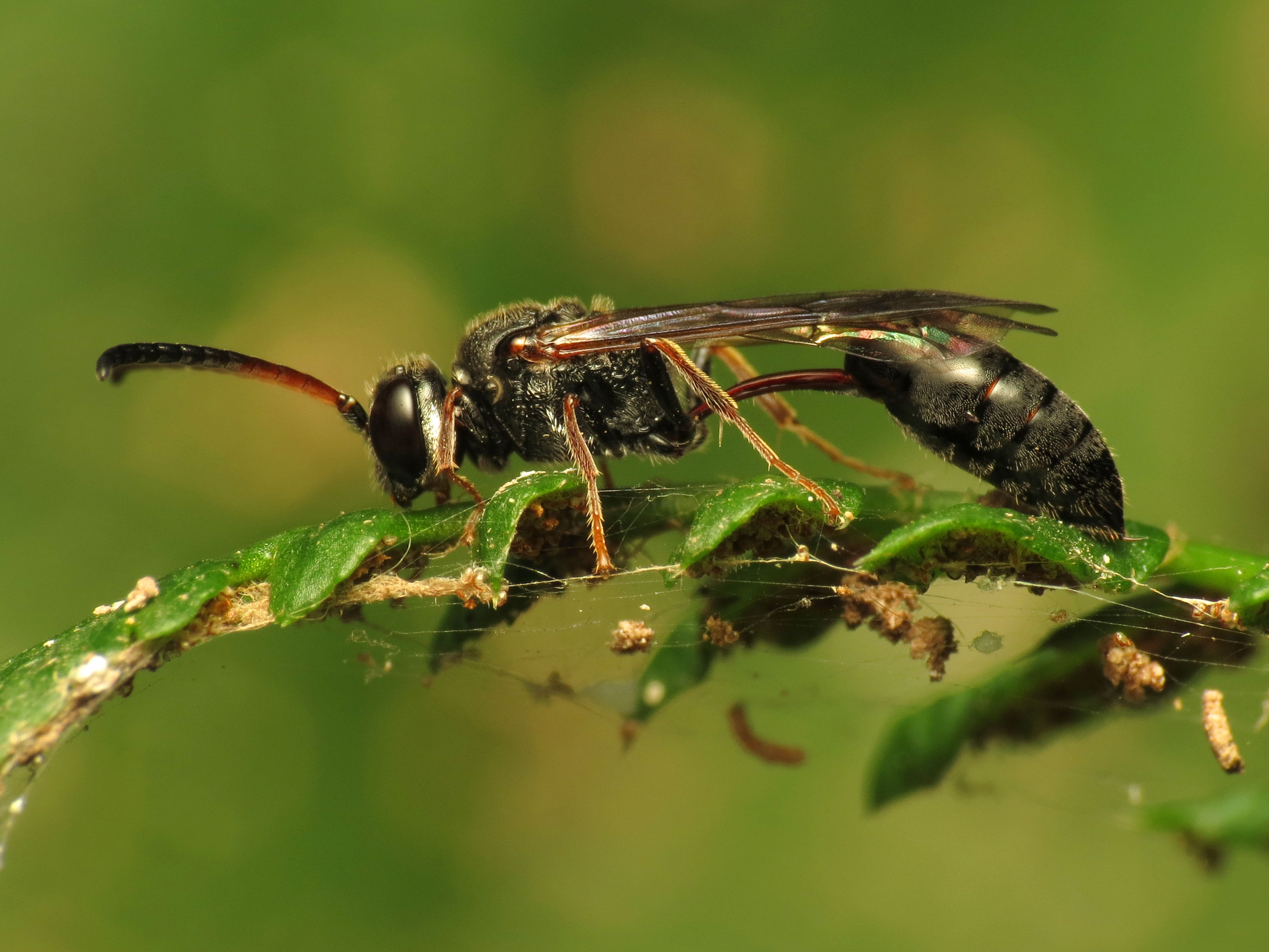
Psen erythropoda

== Species ==
- Psen affinis Gussakovskij, 1937
- Psen alishanus Tsuneki, 1967
- Psen amboinensis van Lith, 1965
- Psen angulifrons van Lith, 1965
- Psen anodontotus van Lith, 1976
- Psen aspites van Lith, 1968
- Psen assamensis van Lith, 1965
- Psen ater (Olivier, 1792)
- Psen aureohirtus Rohwer, 1921
- Psen aurifrons Tsuneki, 1959
- Psen bakeri Rohwer, 1923
- Psen barthi Viereck, 1907
- Psen betremi van Lith, 1959
- Psen bettoh Tsuneki, 1977
- Psen bishopi van Lith, 1968
- Psen bnun Tsuneki, 1971
- Psen boninensis Nagase, 2000
- Psen brinchangensis van Lith, 1965
- Psen bryani Perkins and Cheesman, 1928
- Psen carbonarius (F. Smith, 1865)
- Psen cheesmanae Krombein, 1949
- Psen congolus Leclercq, 1961
- Psen coriaceus van Lith, 1959
- Psen curvipilosus van Lith, 1959
- Psen dzimm Tsuneki, 1959
- Psen elisabethae van Lith, 1959
- Psen emarginatus van Lith, 1959
- Psen erythrocnemus van Lith, 1975
- Psen erythropoda Rohwer, 1910
- Psen eurypygus van Lith, 1965
- Psen foveicornis Tsuneki, 1982
- Psen foveolatus Budrys, 1986
- Psen fuscinervis (Cameron, 1899)
- Psen hanedanus Terayama and Murota, 2016
- Psen heinrichi van Lith, 1968
- Psen hirashimai Tsuneki, 1966
- Psen inflatus van Lith, 1968
- Psen irwini (Bohart and Grissell, 1969)
- Psen kalilicus Tsuneki, 1982
- Psen koreanus Tsuneki, 1959
- Psen krombeini van Lith, 1965
- Psen kulingensis van Lith, 1965
- Psen lacuniventris L. Ma and Q. Li, 2007
- Psen leclercqi van Lith, 1974
- Psen lieftincki van Lith, 1959
- Psen lobicornis van Lith, 1973
- Psen marjoriae van Lith, 1968
- Psen matalensis R. Turner, 1912
- Psen melanosoma Rohwer, 1921
- Psen metallicus van Lith, 1975
- Psen miyagino Tsuneki, 1983
- Psen monticola (Packard, 1867)
- Psen montivagus (Dalla Torre, 1897)
- Psen nepalensis van Lith, 1968
- Psen nigriventris van Lith, 1965
- Psen nitidus van Lith, 1959
- Psen novahibernicus van Lith, 1965
- Psen opacus van Lith, 1959
- Psen orientalis Cameron, 1890
- Psen paranaensis van Lith, 1975
- Psen patellatus Arnold, 1924
- Psen paulus van Lith, 1968
- Psen pilosus van Lith, 1965
- Psen politiventris Rohwer, 1921
- Psen pulcher (Cameron, 1891)
- Psen refractus Nurse, 1903
- Psen regalis van Lith, 1968
- Psen richardsi Tsuneki, 1959
- Psen rubicundus van Lith, 1959
- Psen ruficrus van Lith, 1965
- Psen rufiventris Cameron, 1890
- Psen rufoannulatus Cameron, 1907
- Psen sauteri van Lith, 1968
- Psen sedlaceki van Lith, 1968
- Psen seminitidus van Lith, 1965
- Psen seriatispinosus L. Ma and Q. Li, 2006
- Psen shirozui Tsuneki, 1966
- Psen shukuzanus Tsuneki, 1972
- Psen silvaticus Arnold, 1924
- Psen simlensis van Lith, 1968
- Psen spinitibialis L. Ma and Q. Li, 2007
- Psen striolatus (Cameron, 1891)
- Psen tanoi Tsuneki, 1967
- Psen terayamai Tsuneki, 1982
- Psen terrigenus van Lith, 1959
- Psen toxopeusi van Lith, 1959
- Psen triangulatus van Lith, 1959
- Psen unifasciculatus Malloch, 1933
- Psen ussuriensis van Lith, 1959
- Psen vadosus van Lith, 1968
- Psen vechti van Lith, 1959
- Psen venetus Pate, 1946
- Psen yasumatsui Gussakovskij, 1934
- Psen yomasanus van Lith, 1965
- Psen yunnanensis L. Ma and Q. Li, 2007
