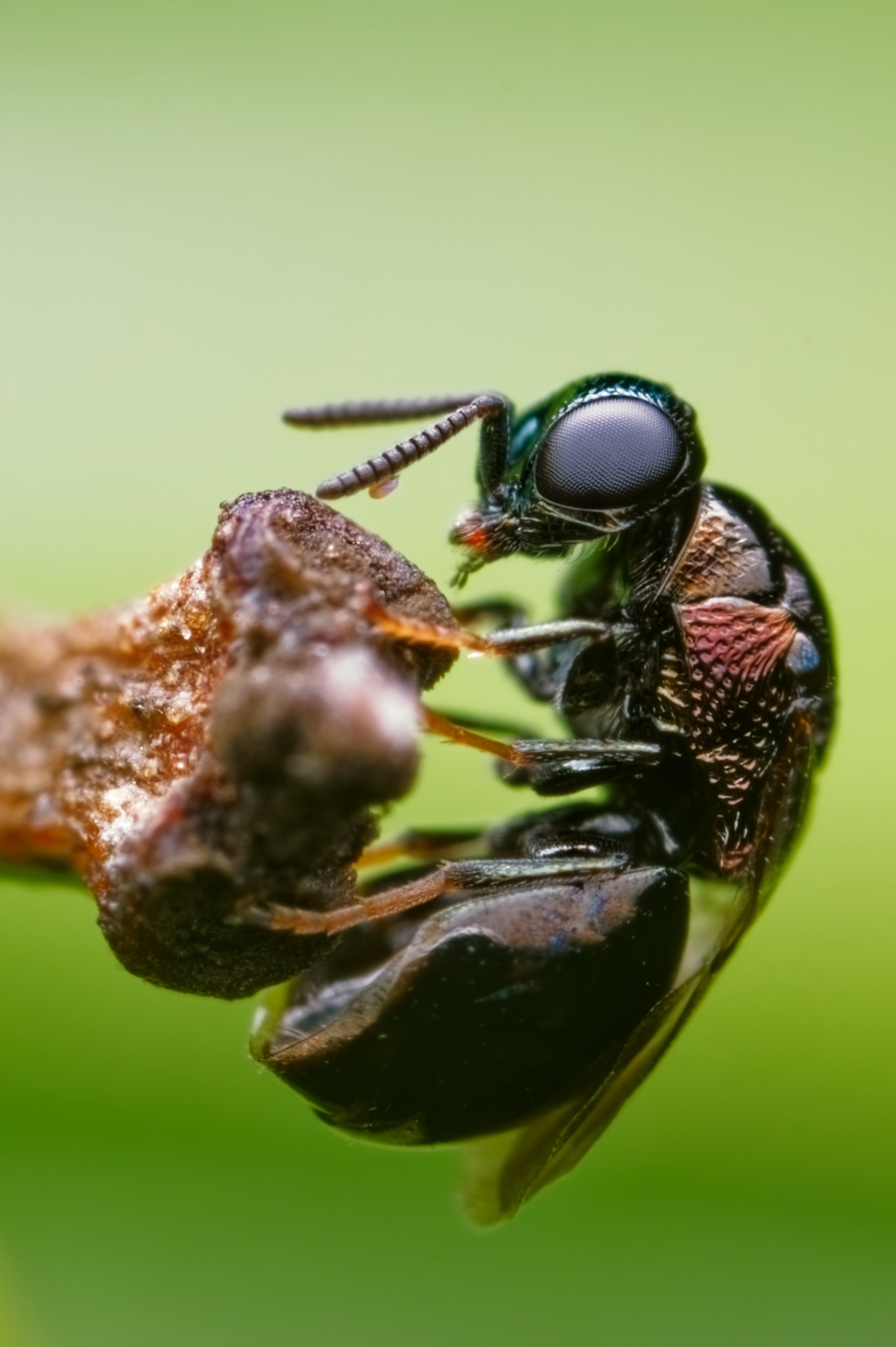
- Holophris sp.

Scientific classification
- Kingdom: Animalia
- Phylum: Arthropoda
- Class: Insecta
- Order: Hymenoptera
- Family: Chrysididae
- Subfamily: Chrysidinae
- Tribe: Elampini
- Genus: Holophris; Mocsáry, 1890

= Holophris =

Genus of wasps

Holophris is a genus of wasps in the Elampini tribe of the family Chrysididae.

== Species ==
- Holophris confusus Kimsey, 1988
- Holophris coriaceus Dahlbom, 1850
- Holophris huberi Ducke, 1901
- Holophris kalliopsis Zimmermann, 1961
- Holophris marginella Mocsary, 1890
- Holophris melinh Nguyen & Wisniowski, 2021
- Holophris spec Strumia, 1995
- Holophris straitus Edney, 1940
- Holophris taiwanus Tsuneki, 1970
- Holophris thailandica Rosa, Wei, Notton & Xu, 2016
