= Pseneo =

Scientific classification
- Domain: Eukaryota
- Kingdom: Animalia
- Phylum: Arthropoda
- Class: Insecta
- Order: Hymenoptera
- Superfamily: Apoidea
- Family: Psenidae
- Genus: Pseneo; Malloch, 1933

Synonyms
- Punctipsen van Lith, 1968

Genus of wasps

Pseneo is a genus of aphid wasps in the family Psenidae. There are more than 20 described species in Pseneo.

== Species ==
These 27 species belong to the genus Pseneo:

- Pseneo argentina (Brèthes, 1910)
- Pseneo auratus (van Lith, 1959)
- Pseneo aureolus (van Lith, 1975)
- Pseneo aurifrons (Taschenberg, 1875)
- Pseneo auriger (van Lith, 1975)
- Pseneo auriventris (van Lith, 1975)
- Pseneo canalicus (van Lith, 1975)
- Pseneo claviventris (Cameron, 1891)
- Pseneo collantes Genaro & Alayo, 2001
- Pseneo cooperi (van Lith, 1975)
- Pseneo eliasi (van Lith, 1975)
- Pseneo exaratus (Eversmann, 1849)
- Pseneo funicularius (van Lith, 1975)
- Pseneo garcesii Genaro & Alayo, 2001
- Pseneo joergenseni (Brèthes, 1913)
- Pseneo leytensis R. Bohart & Grissell, 1969
- Pseneo longiventris (Cameron, 1891)
- Pseneo madecassus (Arnold, 1945)
- Pseneo magnificus (van Lith, 1975)
- Pseneo minidentatus (van Lith, 1975)
- Pseneo multipunctatus (van Lith, 1959)
- Pseneo nigripes (van Lith, 1975)
- Pseneo punctatus (W. Fox, 1898)
- Pseneo simplicicornis (W. Fox, 1898)
- Pseneo taschenbergi (van Lith, 1975)
- Pseneo townesi (van Lith, 1959)
- Pseneo tridentatus (van Lith, 1959)
