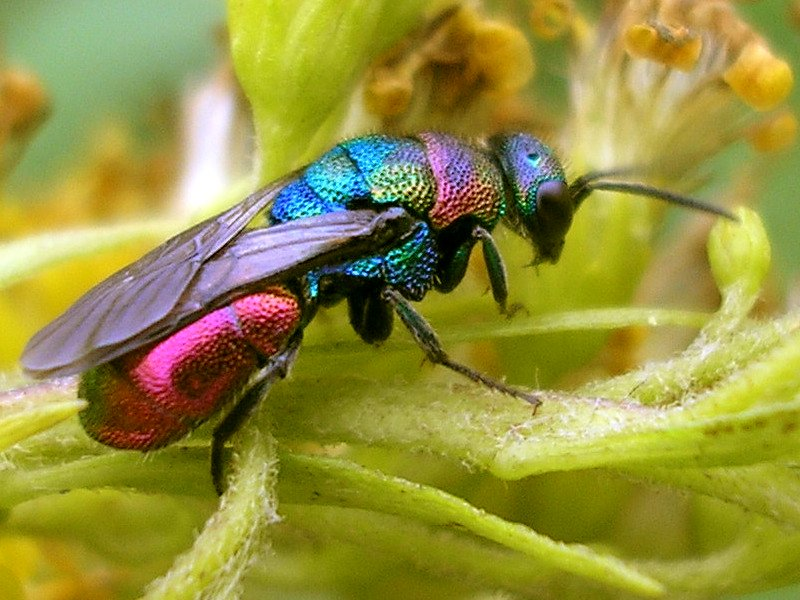

Scientific classification
- Domain: Eukaryota
- Kingdom: Animalia
- Phylum: Arthropoda
- Class: Insecta
- Order: Hymenoptera
- Family: Chrysididae
- Genus: Hedychrum
- Species: H. rutilans

Binomial name
- Hedychrum rutilans Dahlbom, 1854

Synonyms
- Hedychrum intermedium Dahlbom, 1845

= Hedychrum rutilans =

Species of wasp

Hedychrum rutilans is a species of cuckoo wasps (insects in the family Chrysididae). The species occurs primarily in Austria, Italy, Bulgaria, Greece, France, Poland, Portugal, Spain, Switzerland and in North Africa. The head and thorax are metallic green with red spots, while the abdomen is red. The color is more green and partially golden in the male and more extensively golden-red in the female. The body is somewhat hairy.

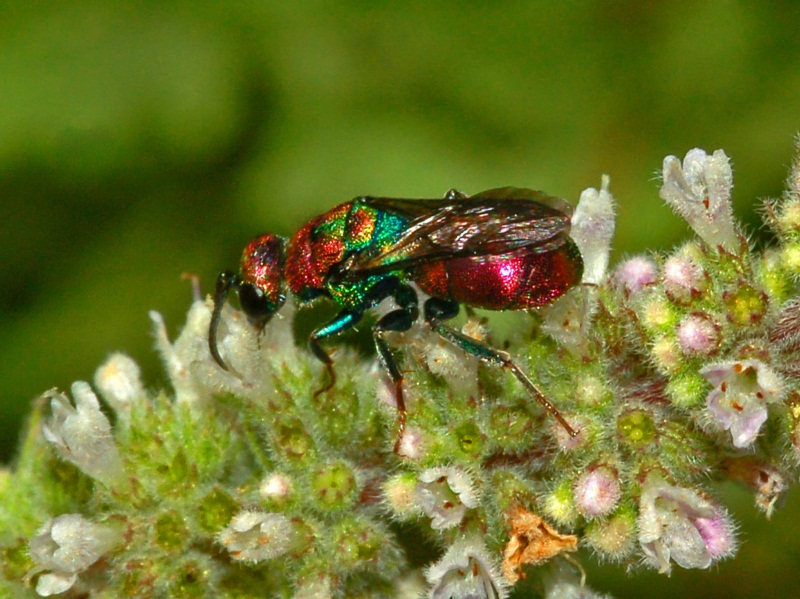
H. rutilans – female feeding on Mentha sp.

== Biology ==
Hedychrum rutilans is a cleptoparasite and parasitoid of larvae of beewolves (Philanthus triangulum and Philanthus coronatus). The female cuckoo wasp lays its eggs on the paralyzed honeybee workers serving as provisions for the beewolf larvae, placed by the female beewolf in its brood cells. The cuckoo wasp larvae feed on the honeybees and on the larvae of the beewolf. Adults grow up to 4–10 mm (0.16–0.39 in) long and can be encountered from late June to September, often feeding on flowers of Mentha species, Achillea millefolium and Euphorbia paralias, but also on honeydew or various exudates. They prefer sandy and warm habitats.

== Subspecies ==
- Hedychrum rutilans var. rutilans Dahlbom, 1854
- Hedychrum rutilans var. subparvulum Linsenmaier, 196
- Hedychrum rutilans var. viridiauratum Mocsáry, 1889
- Hedychrum rutilans var. viridiaureum Tournier, 1877
