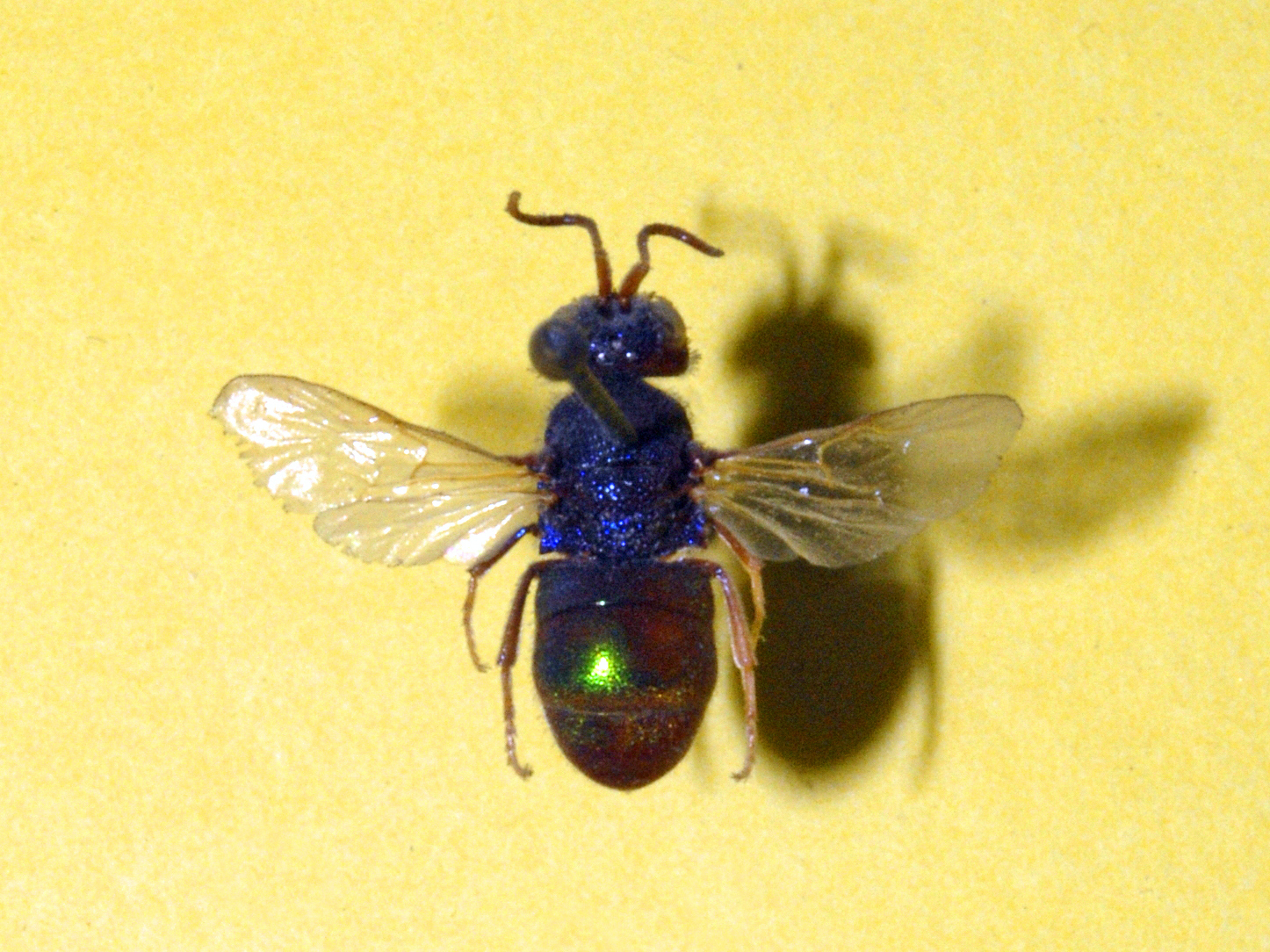
- Museum specimen

Scientific classification
- Kingdom: Animalia
- Phylum: Arthropoda
- Class: Insecta
- Order: Hymenoptera
- Family: Chrysididae
- Genus: Holopyga
- Species: H. fastuosa

Binomial name
- Holopyga fastuosa (H. Lucas, 1849)

Synonyms
- Holopyga ovata Dahlbom, 1854

= Holopyga fastuosa =

Species of wasp

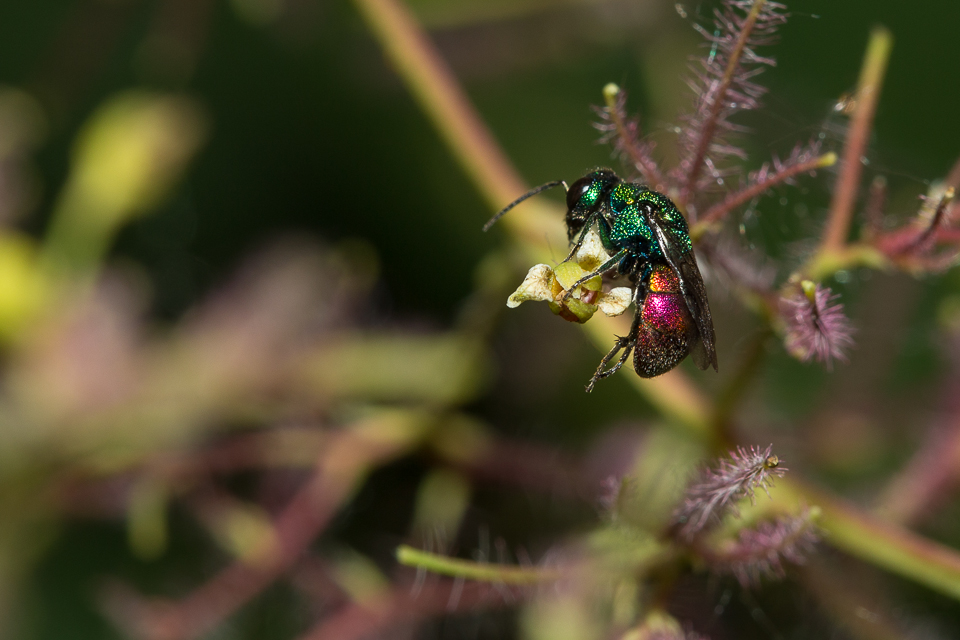

Holopyga fastuosa is a species of cuckoo wasp (insects belonging to the family Chrysididae).

== Subspecies ==
- Holopyga fastuosa effrenata Linsenmaier, 1959
- Holopyga fastuosa fastuosa (H. Lucas, 1849)
- Holopyga fastuosa generosa (Förster, 1853)
- Holopyga fastuosa proviridis Linsenmaier, 1959
- Holopyga fastuosa virideaurata Linsenmaier, 1951

== Distribution ==
This species is present in Greece, Italy, Spain, Slovenia, Switzerland, in the east Palearctic realm, in the Near East and in North Africa.
