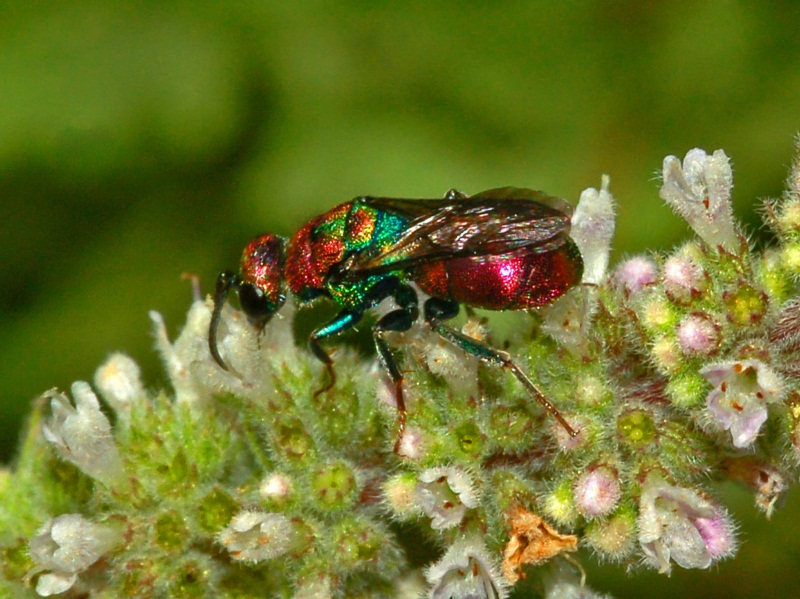
- Hedychrum rutilans, female feeding on Mentha sp.

Scientific classification
- Kingdom: Animalia
- Phylum: Arthropoda
- Clade: Pancrustacea
- Class: Insecta
- Order: Hymenoptera
- Family: Chrysididae
- Subfamily: Chrysidinae
- Tribe: Elampini
- Genus: Hedychrum; Latreille, 1806

= Hedychrum =

Genus of wasps

Hedychrum is a large genus of cuckoo wasps (the family Chrysididae). With roughly 150 species, it is the second largest genus in the family; most species are from the Palaearctic, but they can be found in the Oriental, Afrotropical, Nearctic, and Neotropical regions. Their hosts are typically from the subfamily Philanthinae.

== Selected European species ==
- Hedychrum aureicolle Mocsary, 1889
- Hedychrum chalybaeum Dahlbom, 1854
- Hedychrum gerstaeckeri Chevrier, 1869
- Hedychrum longicolle Abeille de Perrin, 1877
- Hedychrum luculentum Förster, 1853
- Hedychrum mavromoustakisi Trautmann, 1929
- Hedychrum micans Lucas, 1849
- Hedychrum niemelai Linsenmaier, 1959
- Hedychrum nobile Scopoli, 1763
- Hedychrum rufipes R. du Buysson, 1893
- Hedychrum rutilans Dahlbom, 1854 (syn. Hedychrum intermedium)
- Hedychrum tobiasi Kilimnik, 1993
- Hedychrum virens Dahlbom, 1854
- Hedychrum viridilineolatum Kilimnik, 1993

== Gallery ==
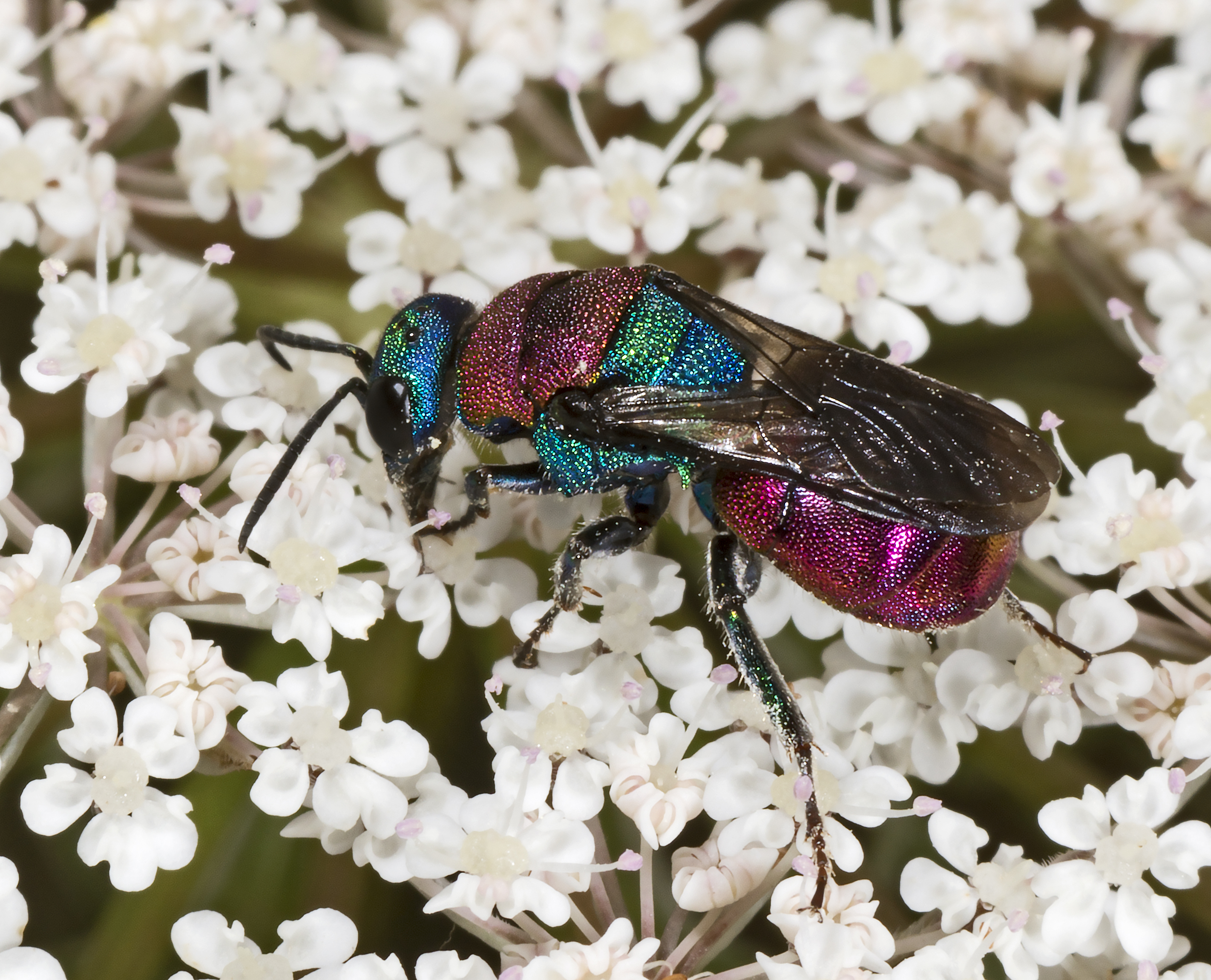
Hedychrum nobile

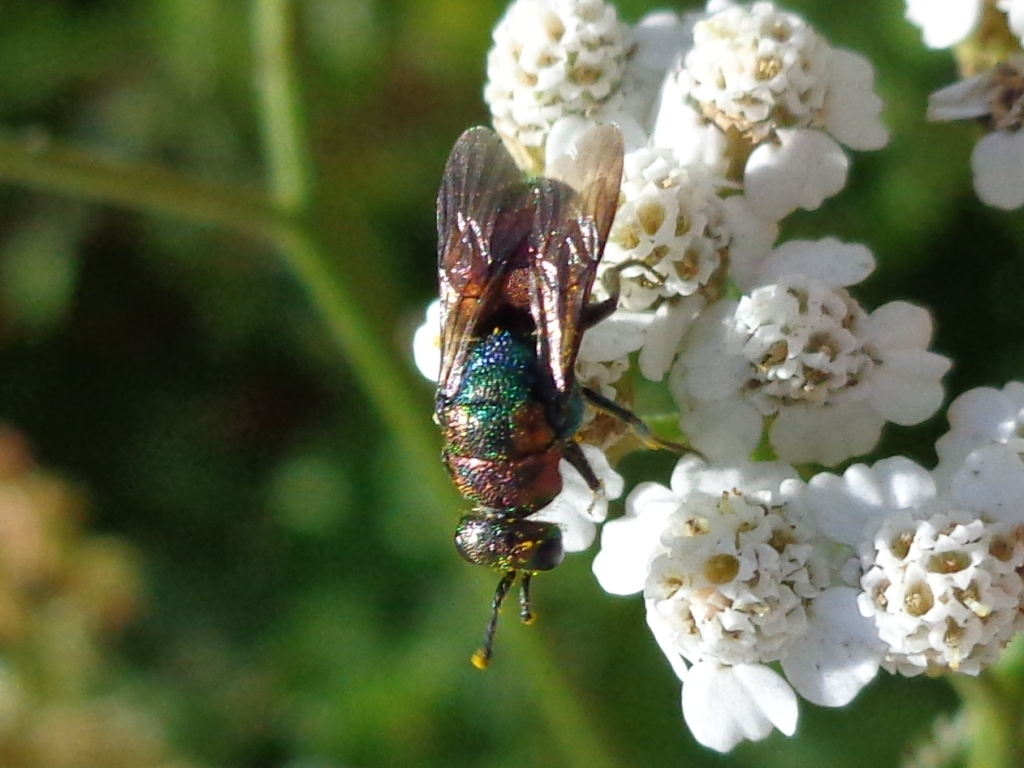
Hedychrum rutilans
