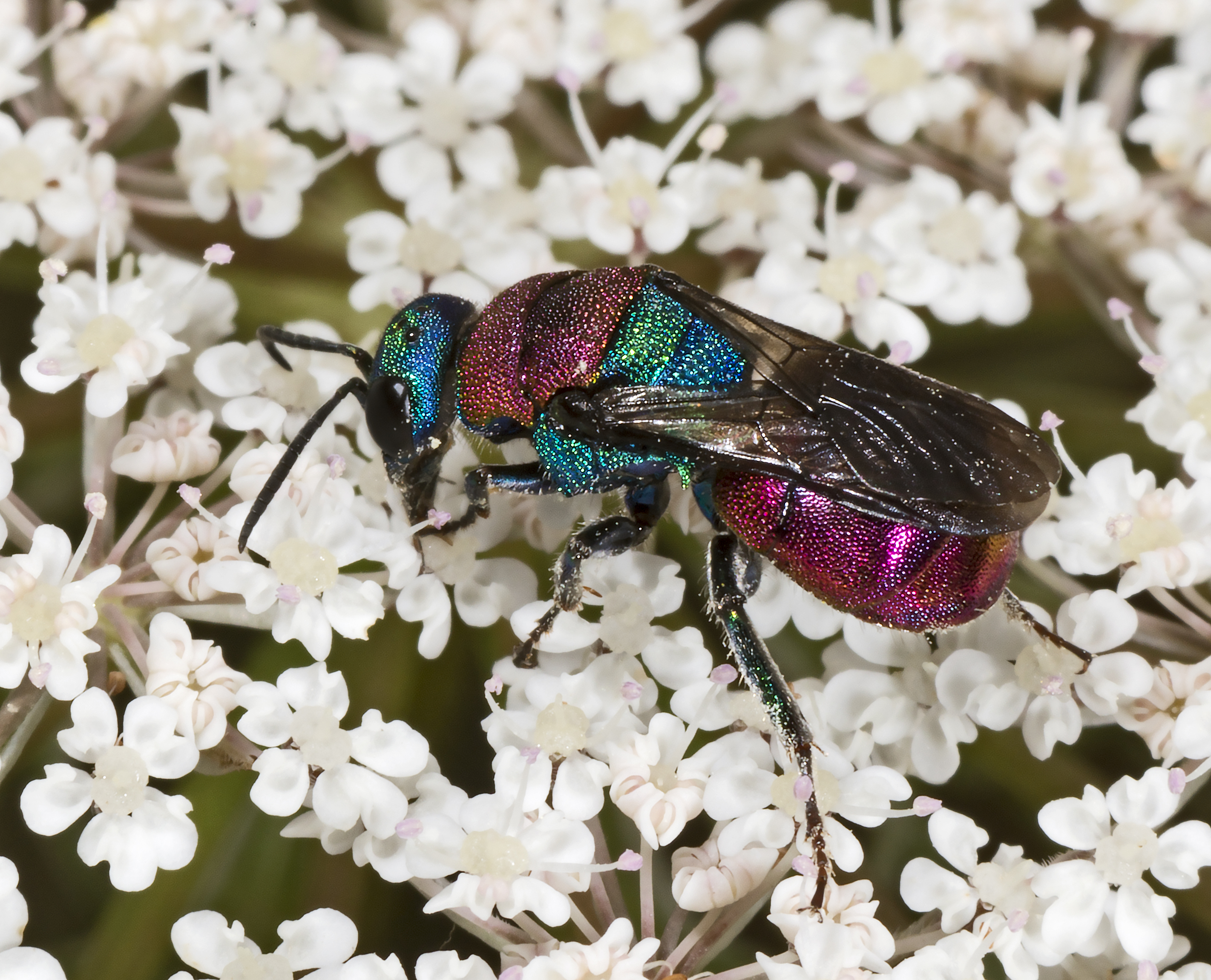

Scientific classification
- Kingdom: Animalia
- Phylum: Arthropoda
- Class: Insecta
- Order: Hymenoptera
- Family: Chrysididae
- Genus: Hedychrum
- Species: H. nobile

Binomial name
- Hedychrum nobile Scopoli, 1763

= Hedychrum nobile =

Species of wasp

Hedychrum nobile is a species of cuckoo wasps (insect in the family Chrysididae).

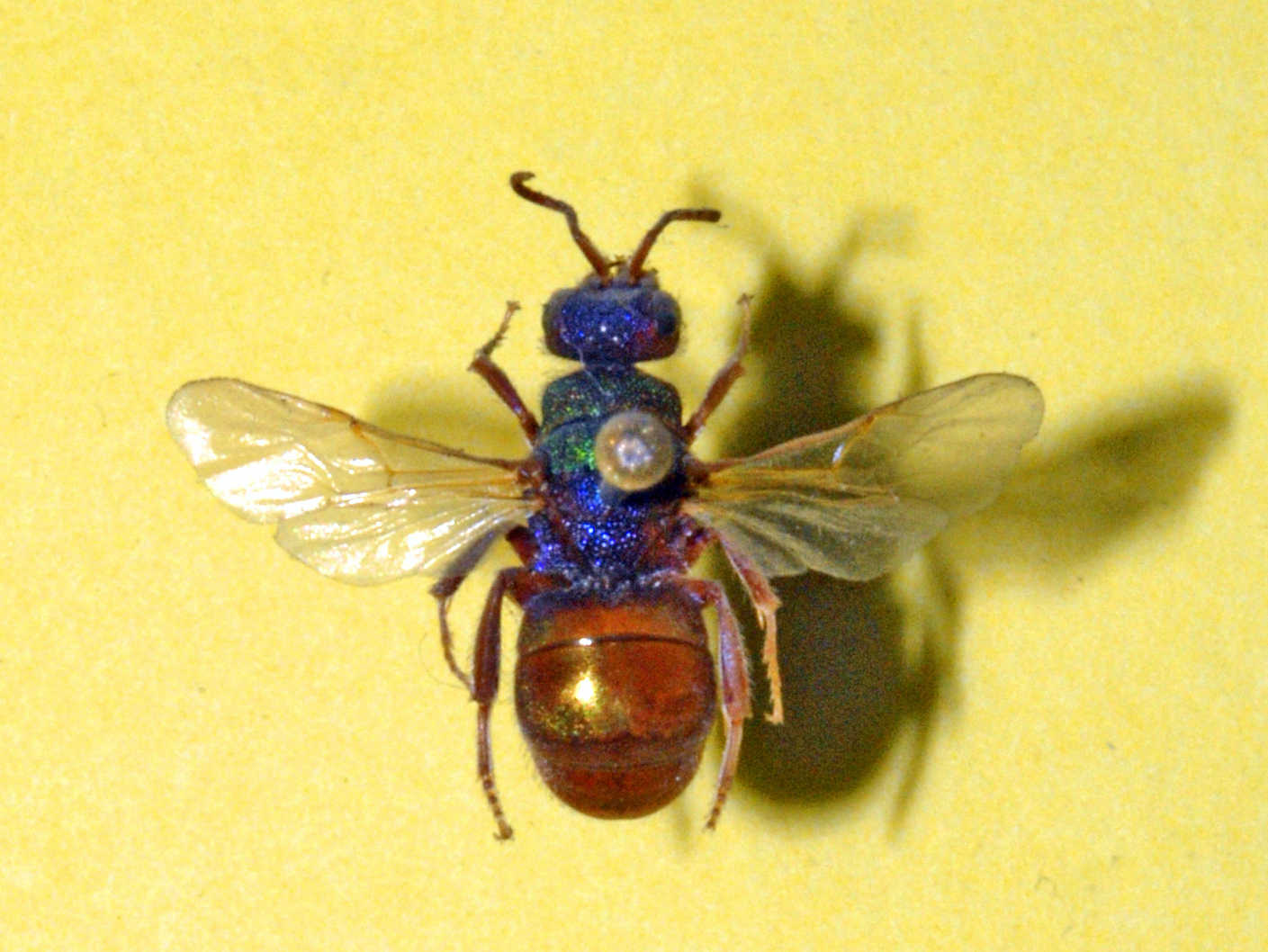
Hedychrum nobile. Museum specimen

== Subspecies ==
- Hedychrum nobile antigai R. du Buysson, 1896
- Hedychrum nobile nobile (Scopoli, 1763)

== Description ==
Hedychrum nobile can reach a length of 4–9 millimetres (0.16–0.35 in). Head, scutellum, post scutellum and median segment are blue or green, pronotum, mesonotum and the abdomen are golden purple.

== Ecology ==
These wasps fly from mid-June to September. Usually they prefer sandy habitats and rocky slopes. The main host species of this parasitic wasp is Cerceris arenaria.

== Distribution ==
This species can be found in Austria, France, Germany, Greece, Italy, Poland, Portugal, Spain, Switzerland, in the eastern Palearctic realm and in North Africa.

== Bibliography ==
- Heiko Bellmann: Bienen, Wespen, Ameisen. Hautflügler Mitteleuropas. Franckh-Kosmos Verlags-GmbH & Co KG, Stuttgart 1995, ISBN 3-440-09690-4.
- Rolf Witt: Wespen. Beobachten, Bestimmen. Naturbuch-Verlag, Augsburg 1998, ISBN 3-89440-243-1.
