= Elampus cecchiniae =

Scientific classification
- Kingdom: Animalia
- Phylum: Arthropoda
- Class: Insecta
- Order: Hymenoptera
- Family: Chrysididae
- Genus: Elampus
- Species: E. cecchiniae

Binomial name
- Elampus cecchiniae (Semenov, 1967)

Synonyms
- Notozus cecchiniae Semenov, 1967

Species of cuckoo wasp

Elampus cecchiniae is a species of wasp in the cuckoo wasp family (Chrysididae). The species was first described in 1967 by A. P. Semenov-Tian-Shanskij as Notozus cecchiniae and transferred to the genus Elampus in 1991. The holotype is a male that was found in Turkmenistan.
