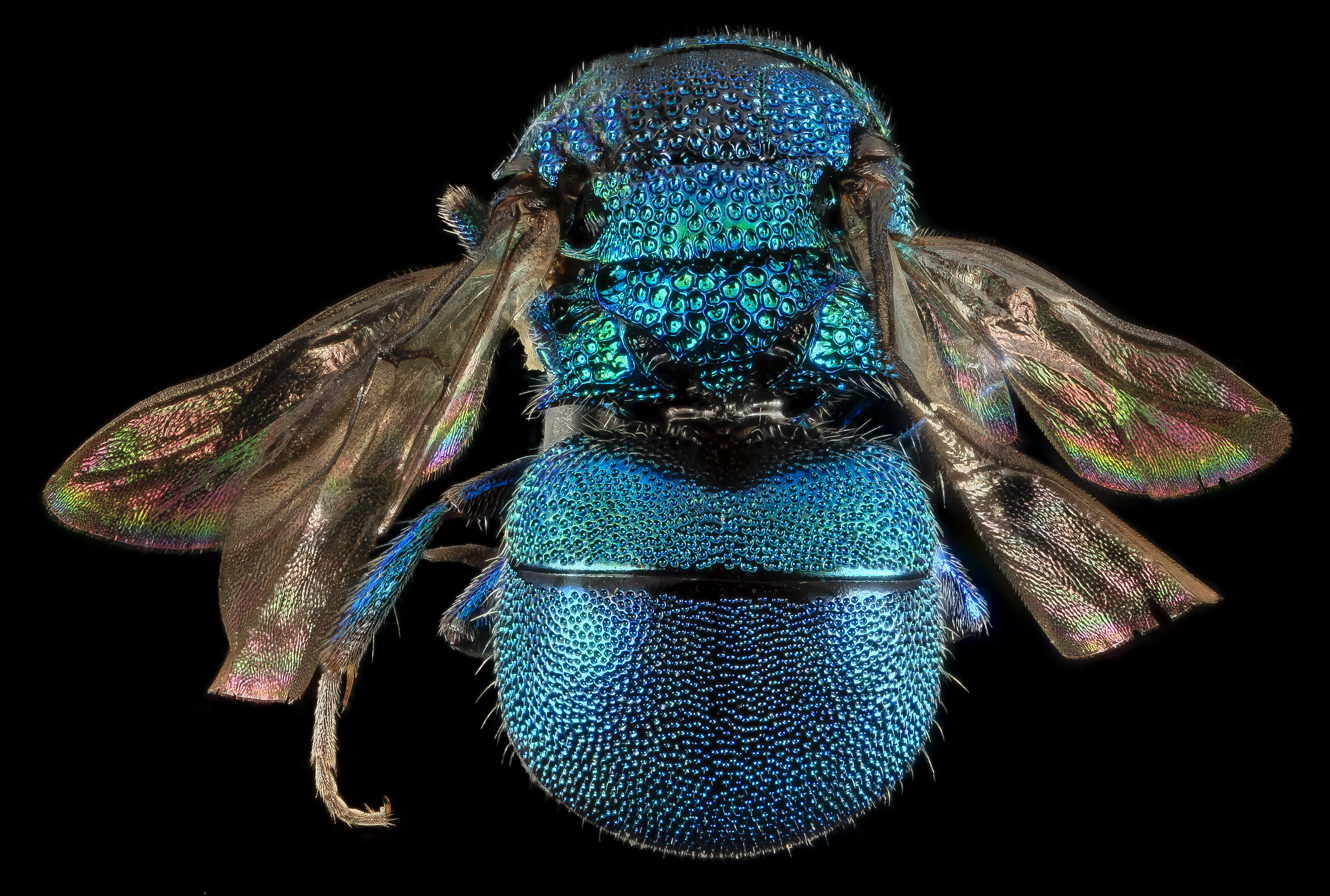
- Hedychridium dimidiatum

Scientific classification
- Kingdom: Animalia
- Phylum: Arthropoda
- Class: Insecta
- Order: Hymenoptera
- Family: Chrysididae
- Subfamily: Chrysidinae
- Tribe: Elampini

= Elampini =

Tribe of wasps

Elampini is a tribe of cuckoo wasps in the family Chrysididae.

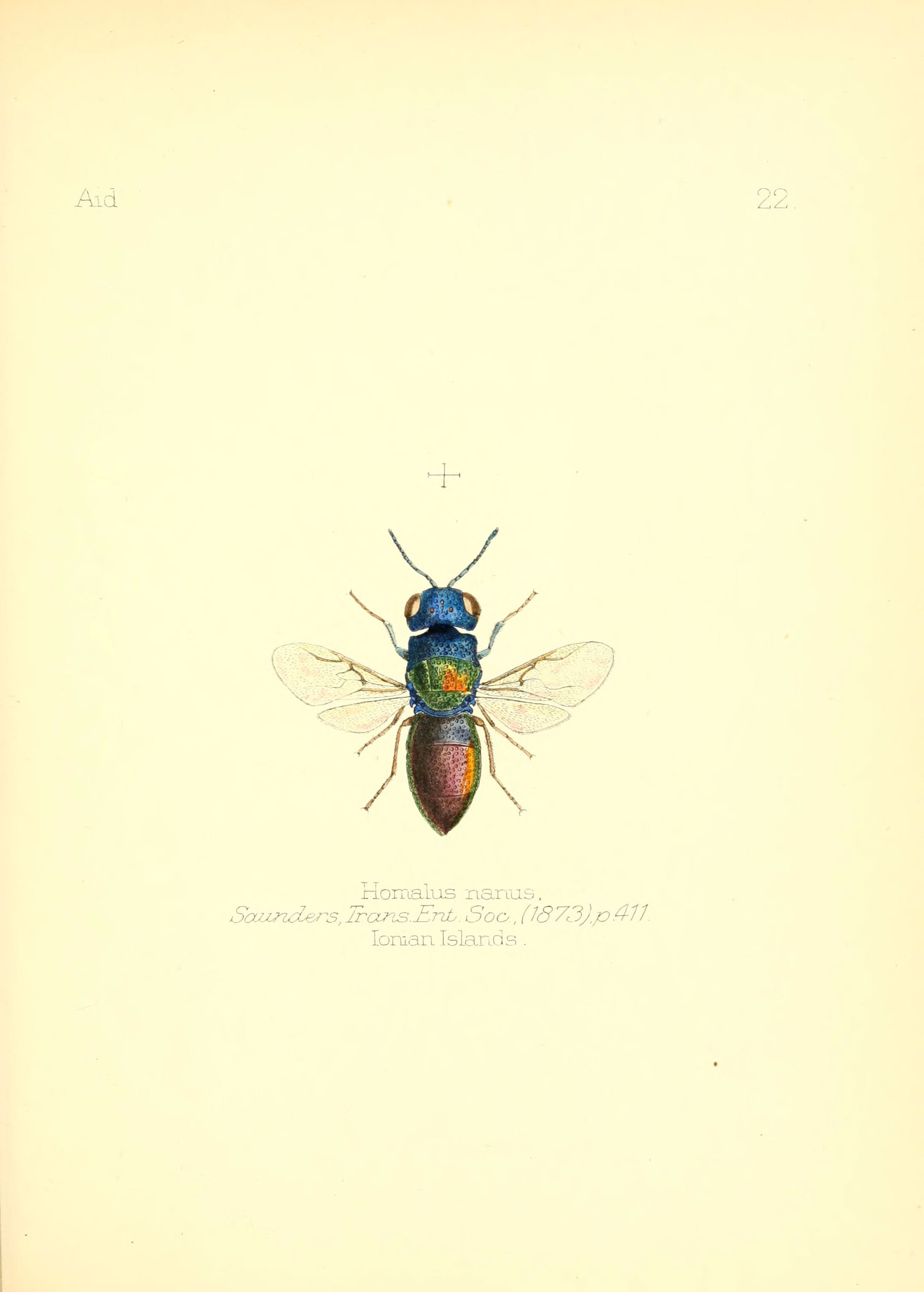
Omalus

== Genera ==
These genera belong to the tribe Elampini:

- Elampus Spinola, 1806^{g b w}
- Hedychridium Abeille de Perrin, 1878^{g b w}
- Hedychrum Latreille, 1806^{g b w}
- Holophris Mocsáry, 1890^{g w}
- Holopyga Dahlbom, 1854^{g b w}
- Microchridium^{b}
- Muesebeckidium Krombein, 1969^{g b}
- Omalus Panzer, 1969^{b}
- Parachrum Kimsey, 1988^{w}
- Philoctetes Abeille de Perrin, 1879^{g b w}
- Pseudomalus Ashmead, 1902^{g b}

Data sources: i = ITIS, c = Catalogue of Life, g = GBIF, b = Bugguide.net, w = WaspWeb
