= Elampus =

Scientific classification
- Domain: Eukaryota
- Kingdom: Animalia
- Phylum: Arthropoda
- Class: Insecta
- Order: Hymenoptera
- Family: Chrysididae
- Tribe: Elampini
- Genus: Elampus; Spinola, 1806

Genus of insects

Elampus is a genus of insects belonging to the family Chrysididae.

The species of this genus are found in Europe, Asia, Africa and North America.

Species:

- Elampus albipennis Mocsary, 1889
- Elampus ambiguus Dahlbom, 1854
- Elampus bidens (Förster, 1853)
- Elampus cecchiniae (Semenov, 1967)
- Elampus gayi Spinola, 1851
- Elampus kashmirensis (Nurse, 1902)
- Elampus macuxi
- Elampus musashinus (Tsuneki, 1986)
- Elampus pulchricollis (Ducke, 1911)
