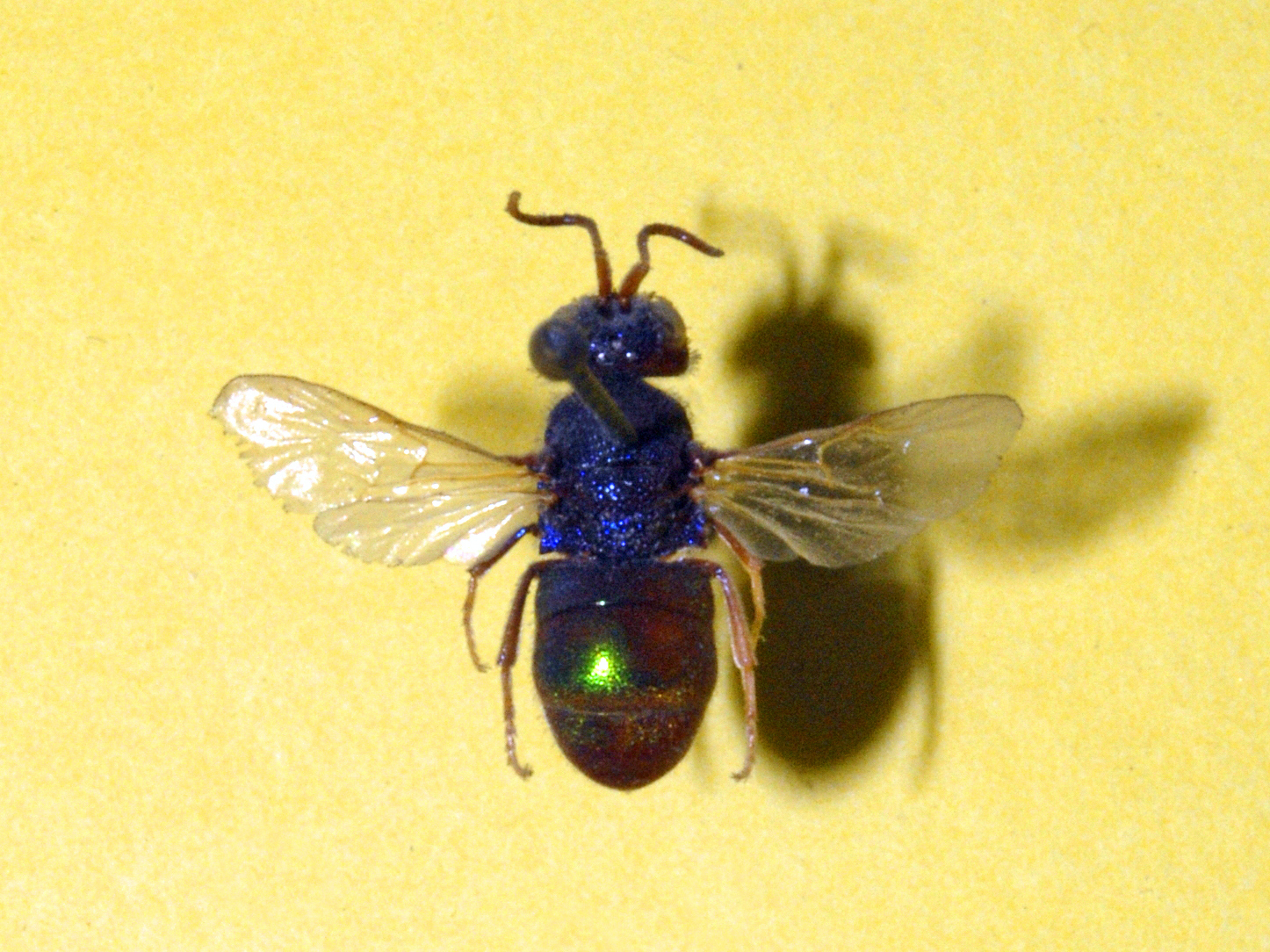
- Holopyga fastuosa

Scientific classification
- Kingdom: Animalia
- Phylum: Arthropoda
- Class: Insecta
- Order: Hymenoptera
- Family: Chrysididae
- Tribe: Elampini
- Genus: Holopyga; Dahlbom, 1854

= Holopyga =

Genus of wasps

Holopyga is a genus of cuckoo wasps (insects belonging to the family Chrysididae).

== Species ==
Species within this genus include:

- Holopyga amoenula (Dahlbom, 1845)
- Holopyga austrialis Linsenmaier, 1959
- Holopyga chrysonota (Förster, 1853)
- Holopyga cupreata Nurse, 1902
- Holopyga cypruscula Linsenmaier, 1959
- Holopyga duplicata Linsenmaier, 1997
- Holopyga fastuosa (Lucas, 1849)
- Holopyga fervida (Fabricius, 1781)
- Holopyga gogorzae Trautmann, 1926
- Holopyga guadarrama Linsenmaier, 1987
- Holopyga hortobagyensis Móczár, 1983
- Holopyga ignicollis Dahlbom, 1854
- Holopyga inflammata (Förster, 1853)
- Holopyga insperata Mocsáry, 1889
- Holopyga jurinei Chevrier, 1862
- Holopyga lucida (Lepeletier, 1806)
- Holopyga mauritanica (Lucas, 1849)
- Holopyga mavromoustakisi Enslin, 1939
- Holopyga merceti Kimsey, 1991
- Holopyga metallica (Dahlbom, 1854)
- Holopyga minuma Linsenmaier, 1959
- Holopyga miranda Abeille de Perrin, 1878
- Holopyga mlokosiewitzi (Radoszkowski, 1876)
- Holopyga nursei Bingham, 1903
- Holopyga parvicornis Linsenmaier, 1987
- Holopyga pseudovata Linsenmaier, 1987
- Holopyga punctatissima Dahlbom, 1854
- Holopyga rubra Linsenmaier, 1999
- Holopyga rugosa (Smith, 1852)
- Holopyga sardoa Invrea, 1952
- Holopyga trapeziphora Linsenmaier, 1987
- Holopyga vigora Linsenmaier, 1959
- Holopyga virescens Mocsáry, 1914
