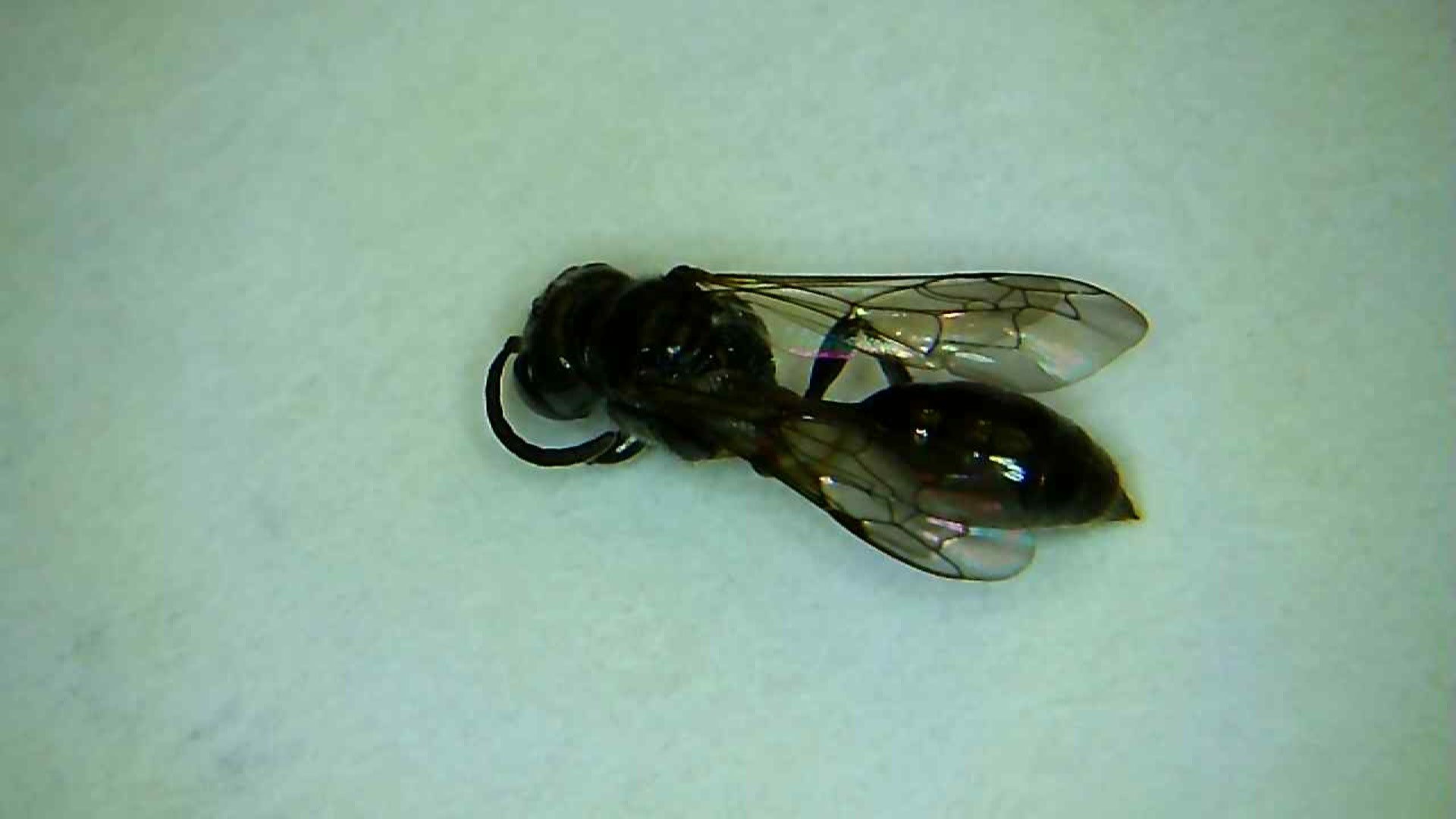
- Mimumesa nigra

Scientific classification
- Domain: Eukaryota
- Kingdom: Animalia
- Phylum: Arthropoda
- Class: Insecta
- Order: Hymenoptera
- Family: Psenidae
- Genus: Mimumesa; Malloch, 1933

Type species
- Mimemesa nigra (Packard, 1867)

= Mimumesa =

Genus of wasps

Mimumesa is a genus of wasps in the family Psenidae. The species are found in the Holarctic. 32 species are known to exist.

== Species (Asia) ==
- Mimumesa melanosomatica (Ma and Q. Li 2009)
- Mimumesa mishimae (Tsuneki 1984)
- Mimumesa nonstriata (Ma and Q. Li 2009)
- Mimumesa scutiprotruberantis (L. Ma, X. Chen and Q. Li 2010)
- Mimumesa vanlithi (Tsuneki 1954)

== Species (Europe) ==
- Mimumesa atratina (F. Morawitz 1891)
- Mimumesa beaumonti (van Lith 1949)
- Mimumesa dahlbomi (Wesmael 1852)
- Mimumesa littoralis (Bondroit 1934)
- Mimumesa sibiricina (R. Bohart 1976)
- Mimumesa spooneri (Richards 1948)
- Mimumesa unicolor (Vander Linden 1829)
- Mimumesa wuestneii (Faester 1951)

== Species (North America) ==
- Mimumesa bermudensis (Malloch 1933)
- Mimumesa canadensis (Malloch 1933)
- Mimumesa clypeata (W. Fox 1898)
- Mimumesa coloradensis (Cameron 1908)
- Mimumesa cylindrica (W. Fox 1898)
- Mimumesa fuscipes (Packard 1867)
- Mimumesa interstitialis (Cameron 1908)
- Mimumesa johnsoni (Vierick 1901)
- Mimumesa leucopus (Say 1837)
- Mimumesa longicornis (W. Fox 1898)
- Mimumesa mandibularis (H. Smith 1908)
- Mimumesa mellipes (Say 1837)
- Mimumesa mixta (W. Fox 1898)
- Mimumesa modesta (Rohwer 1915)
- Mimumesa nigra (Packard 1867)
- Mimumesa petiolata (F. Smith 1863)
- Mimumesa propinqua (Kincaid 1900)
- Mimumesa psychra (Pate 1856)
- Mimumesa regularis (W. Fox 1898)
