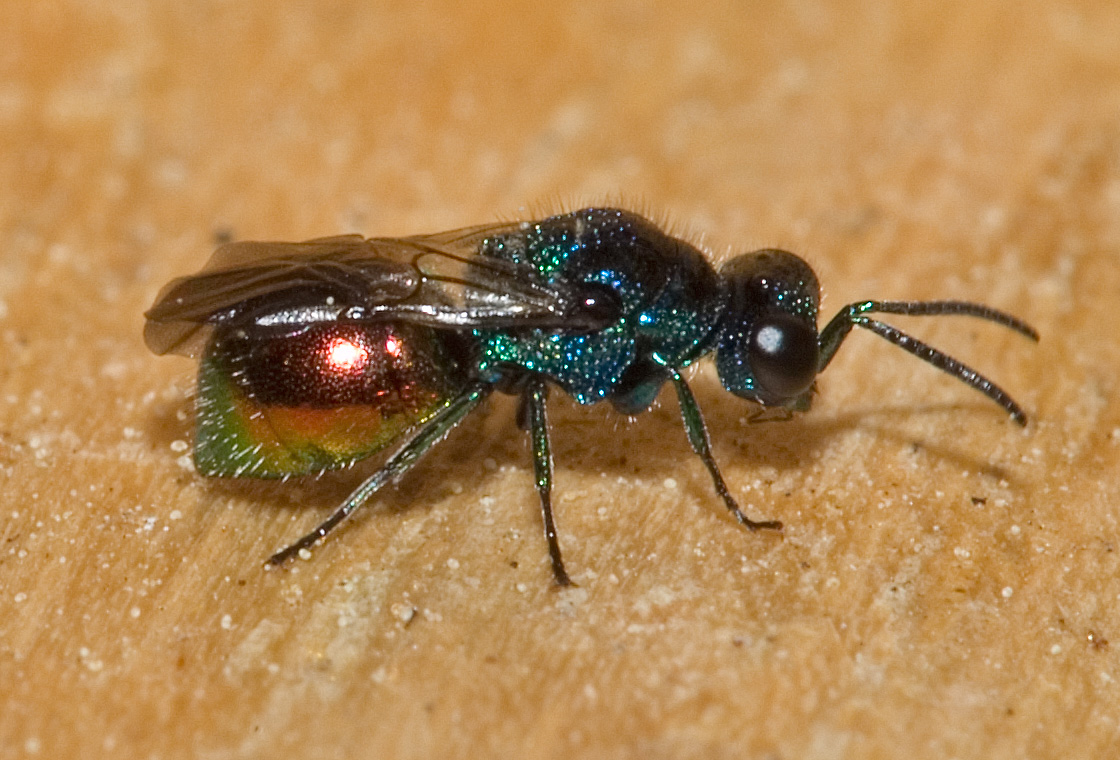
- Pseudomalus auratus

Scientific classification
- Kingdom: Animalia
- Phylum: Arthropoda
- Class: Insecta
- Order: Hymenoptera
- Family: Chrysididae
- Subfamily: Chrysidinae
- Tribe: Elampini
- Genus: Pseudomalus; Ashmead, 1902

= Pseudomalus =

Genus of wasps

Psedomalus is a genus of cuckoo wasps (insects in the family Chrysididae).

== Selected species ==
- Pseudomalus auratus (Linnaeus, 1758)
- Pseudomalus meridianus Strumia, 1996
- Pseudomalus pusillus (Fabricius, 1804)
- Pseudomalus triangulifer (Abeille de Perrin, 1877)
- Pseudomalus violaceus (Scopoli, 1763)
