= Lithium (wasp) =

Scientific classification
- Kingdom: Animalia
- Phylum: Arthropoda
- Class: Insecta
- Order: Hymenoptera
- Family: Psenidae
- Genus: Lithium; Finnamore, 1987

Type species
- Lithium cicatrix Finnamore, 1987

Species
- Lithium baghdadense Schmid-Egger, 2007; Lithium cicatrix Finnamore, 1987; Lithium haladai Schmid-Egger, 2007; Lithium jacobsi Schmid-Egger, 2007

Genus of wasps

The genus Lithium is a group of four described species of aphid wasps, occurring from Mali to Turkey.
