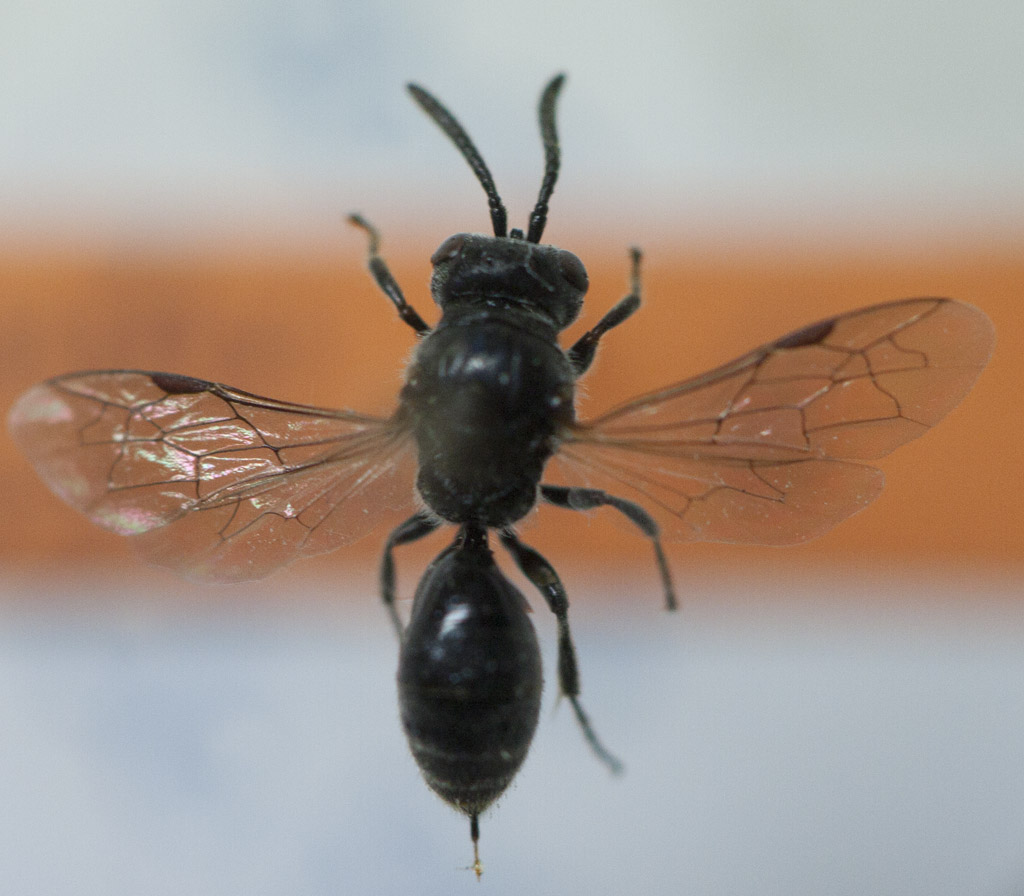
- Psenulus fuscipennis

Scientific classification
- Kingdom: Animalia
- Phylum: Arthropoda
- Class: Insecta
- Order: Hymenoptera
- Superfamily: Apoidea
- Family: Psenidae
- Genus: Psenulus; Kohl, 1897

Type species
- Psenulus fuscipennis (Dahlbohm, 1843)

= Psenulus =

Genus of wasps

Psenulus is a genus of wasps in the family Psenidae. The 173 species are found worldwide, but are best represented in the Indomalayan realm with 68. The Palearctic has 26, the Nearctic 4, and the Australasian realm 3. Psenulus is largely absent from South America (1 species) and entirely absent from Melanesia and Polynesia. A recent phylogenetic analysis provided strong evidence that this genus is the closest living relative to bees.

== Species of Europe ==
- Psenulus berlandi Beaumont, 1937
- Psenulus concolor (Dahlbom, 1843)
- Psenulus cypriacus van Lith, 1973
- Psenulus fulvicornis (Schenck, 1857)
- Psenulus fuscipennis (Dahlbom, 1843)
- Psenulus hidalgo Guichard, 1990
- Psenulus laevigatus (Schenck, 1857)
- Psenulus meridionalis Beaumont, 1937
- Psenulus pallipes (Panzer, 1798)
- Psenulus schencki (Tournier, 1889)
