= Aporia (Forever Never album) =

Studio album by Forever Never
- Released: 20 March 2006
- Recorded: Philia Studios, Henley on Thames; November–December 2005
- Genre: Alternative metal; groove metal; metalcore
- Length: 52:32
- Label: Casket Music/Copro Records
- Producer: Dave Chang

Forever Never chronology
Aporia (2006)	Forever Never (2009)

Professional ratings
Review scores
Source	Rating
Kerrang!	4/5 stars
Rock Hard	8.5/10 stars

Aporia is the debut studio album by English alternative metal band Forever Never. It was released in 2006 by Copro Records. The digital release is entitled Aphoria V2, and contains the original twelve tracks and four live tracks.

== Track listing ==
All songs written by Forever Never. All lyrics by R. Carroll.

1. "Aporia" – 4:47
2. "This World" – 5:03
3. "Better The Epic" – 4:00
4. "Never" – 4:33
5. "0707" – 4:17
6. "As I Lie" – 4:16
7. "Scared To Scarred – 3:36
8. "New Arrival" – 4:20
9. "Reversal" – 4:03
10. "Saviour?" – 4:55
11. "Drowning" – 4:14
12. "Silent Elegy To The Living" – 4:41
13. "Aphoria (live)" – 5:00
14. "As I Lie (live)" – 5:31
15. "Drowning (live)" – 4:27
16. "This world (live)" – 5:15

== Personnel ==
- Renny Carroll – vocals
- Kev Yates – bass
- Sam Machin – guitar
- George Lenox – guitar
- Mike Row – drums
