= Mimesa =

- Mimesa huron

Scientific classification
- Kingdom: Animalia
- Phylum: Arthropoda
- Clade: Pancrustacea
- Class: Insecta
- Order: Hymenoptera
- Family: Psenidae
- Genus: Mimesa; Shuckard, 1837

Synonyms
- Aporia Wesmael, 1852; Aporina Gussakovskij, 1937

Genus of wasps

Mimesa is a genus of wasps in the family Psenidae. The species of this genus are found in Europe and North America.

== Species ==
The following species are recognised in the genus Mimesa:

- Mimesa aegyptiaca
- Mimesa agalena
- Mimesa arizonensis
- Mimesa barri
- Mimesa beckeri
- Mimesa bicolor
- Mimesa breviventris
- Mimesa bruxellensis
- Mimesa cahuilla
- Mimesa caucasica
- Mimesa cheyenne
- Mimesa chinensis
- Mimesa chiricahua
- Mimesa concors
- Mimesa coquilletti
- Mimesa crassipes
- Mimesa cressonii
- Mimesa curta
- Mimesa dawsoni
- Mimesa dzhungarica
- Mimesa edentata
- Mimesa empeyi
- Mimesa equestris
- Mimesa ezra
- Mimesa fallax
- Mimesa filippovi
- Mimesa foxi
- Mimesa gabrielis
- Mimesa grandii
- Mimesa granulosa
- Mimesa gussakovskiji
- Mimesa hissarica
- Mimesa huron
- Mimesa infossa
- Mimesa ipai
- Mimesa jacobsoni
- Mimesa jicarilla
- Mimesa kasparyani
- Mimesa kaszabi
- Mimesa kazenasi
- Mimesa klamath
- Mimesa kurzenkoi
- Mimesa leleji
- Mimesa lutaria
- Mimesa maculipes
- Mimesa mexicana
- Mimesa miwoka
- Mimesa mongolica
- Mimesa nasuta
- Mimesa nigrita
- Mimesa nisenan
- Mimesa pauper
- Mimesa pekingensis
- Mimesa proxima
- Mimesa pulawskii
- Mimesa punctifrons
- Mimesa punctipleuris
- Mimesa pygidialis
- Mimesa quadridentata
- Mimesa rhyssocephalica
- Mimesa sabina
- Mimesa scheuchli
- Mimesa senijextee
- Mimesa serrana
- Mimesa shestakovi
- Mimesa sibirica
- Mimesa sparsipunctulata
- Mimesa sublaevis
- Mimesa tenuis
- Mimesa tequila
- Mimesa tolteca
- Mimesa unicincta
- Mimesa vindobonensis
- Mimesa xanthognatha
- Mimesa zapoteca
- BOLD:AAG7791 (Mimesa sp.)
- BOLD:AAG7854 (Mimesa sp.)
- BOLD:AAG7867 (Mimesa sp.)
- BOLD:AAG7920 (Mimesa sp.)
- BOLD:AAL7511 (Mimesa sp.)
- BOLD:ABY0183 (Mimesa sp.)
- BOLD:ACA5337 (Mimesa sp.)
- BOLD:ACA6161 (Mimesa sp.)
- BOLD:ACJ5396 (Mimesa sp.)
- BOLD:ACN0375 (Mimesa sp.)
- BOLD:ACP4412 (Mimesa sp.)
- BOLD:ACX4475 (Mimesa sp.)
- BOLD:ACY6789 (Mimesa sp.)
- BOLD:ADK8967 (Mimesa sp.)
- BOLD:AER9457 (Mimesa sp.)
