= Aporia (company) =

Israeli ML observability platform

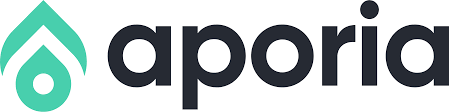
- Type: Private
- Industry: ML observability
- Founded: 2019; 7 years ago
- Founder: Liran Hason and Alon Gubkin
- Headquarters: Tel Aviv, Israel
- Website: https://www.aporia.com/

Aporia is a machine learning observability platform based in Tel Aviv, Israel. The company has a US office located in San Jose, California.

Aporia has developed software for monitoring and controlling undetected defects and failures used by other companies to detect and report anomalies, and warn in the early stages of faults.

== History ==
Aporia was founded in 2019 by Liran Hason and Alon Gubkin. In April 2021, the company raised a $5 million seed round for its monitoring platform for ML models.

In February 2022, the company closed a Series A round of $25 million for its ML observability platform. Aporia was named by Forbes as the Next Billion-Dollar Company in June 2022. In November, the company partnered with ClearML, an MLOPs platform, to improve ML pipeline optimization.

In January 2023, Aporia launched Direct Data Connectors, a novel technology allowing organizations to monitor their ML models in minutes (previously the process of integrating ML monitoring into a customer’s cloud environment took weeks or more.) DDC (Direct Data Connectors) enables users to connect Aporia to their preferred data source and monitor all of their data at once, without data sampling or data duplication (which is a huge security risk for major organizations.

In April 2023, Aporia announced the company partnered with Amazon Web Services (AWS) to provide more reliable ML observability to AWS consumers by deploying Aporia's architecture to their AWS environment, this will allow customers to monitor their models in production regardless of platform.
