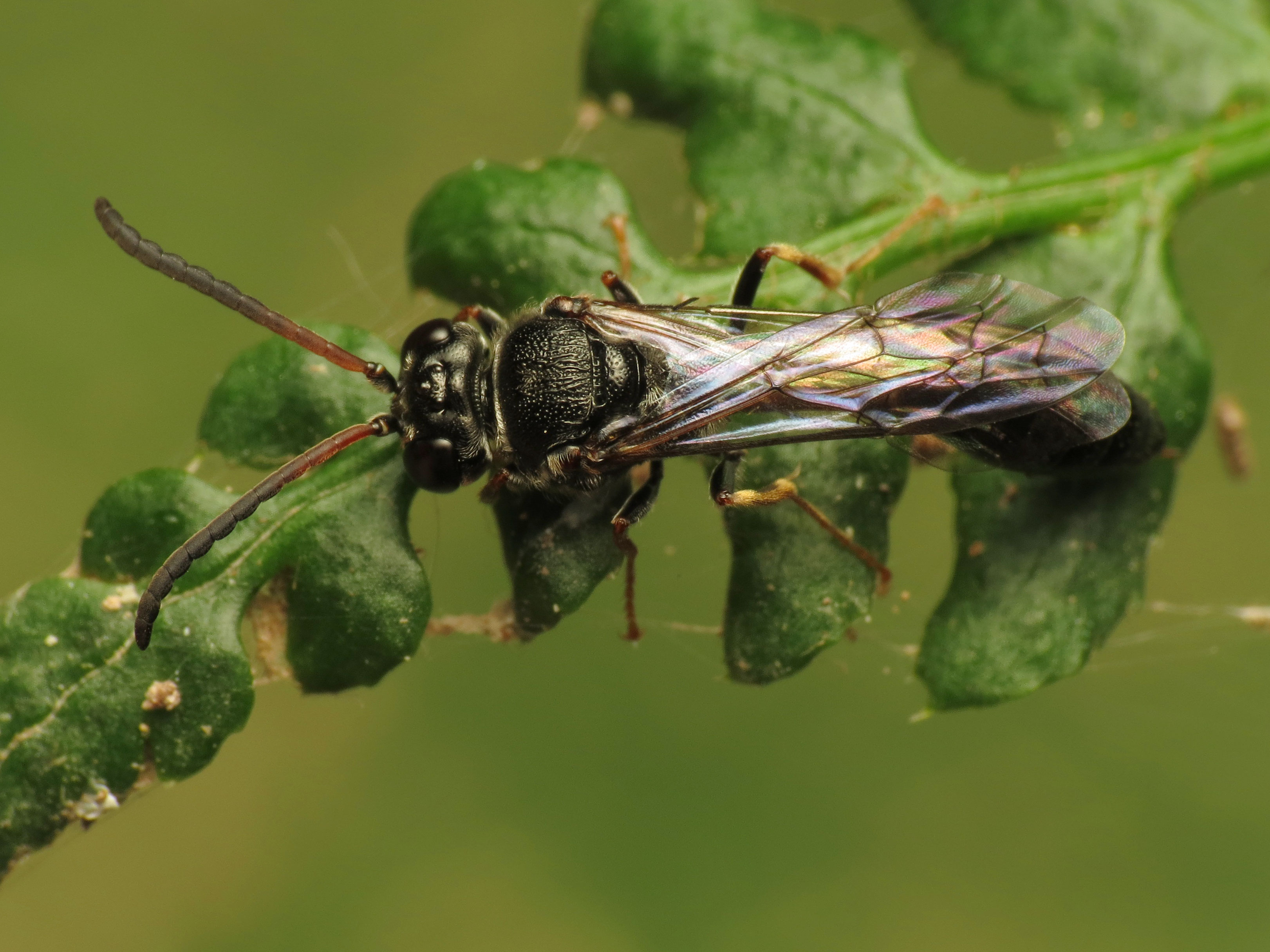
- Psen erythropoda

Scientific classification
- Kingdom: Animalia
- Phylum: Arthropoda
- Clade: Pancrustacea
- Class: Insecta
- Order: Hymenoptera
- Superfamily: Apoidea
- Family: Psenidae; A. Costa, 1858

Synonyms
- Psenini A. Costa, 1858; Odontosphecini Menke, 1967

= Psenidae =

Family of wasps

Psenidae is a family of aphid wasps in the superfamily Apoidea formerly treated as the tribe Psenini. There are 12 genera and at least 485 described species of Psenidae.

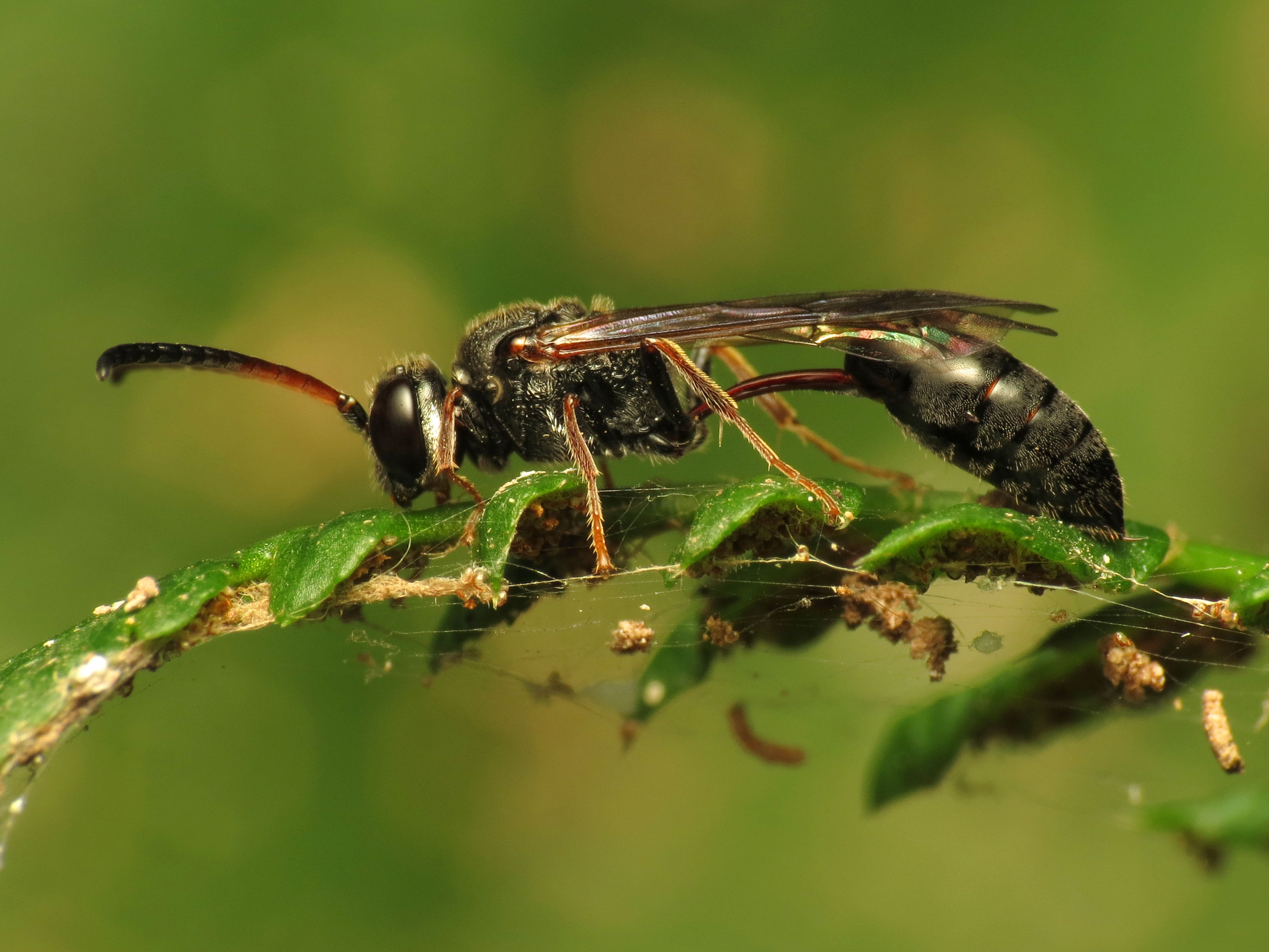
Psen erythropoda

== Taxonomy and phylogeny ==
As Psenini, this taxon was previously treated as one of 4 tribes under the subfamily Pemphredoninae within Crabronidae. Following phylogenetic analyses Crabronidae was found to be paraphyletic due to the exclusion of Anthophila. As part of this revision, Pemphredoninae was also found to be polyphyletic and was split into 4 families. Psenini and Odontosphecini were combined and elevated to Psenidae. Ammoplanina (a subtribe of Pemphredonini) was elevated to Ammoplanidae, the remaining Pemphredonini to Pemphredonidae, and Entomosericini to Entomosericidae.

Psenidae is the sister lineage to Ammoplanidae, while Pemphredonidae is sister to Philanthidae.

== Genera ==
These 12 genera belong to the family Psenidae:

- Ammopsen Krombein, 1959^{i c g}
- Deinomimesa Perkins, 1899^{i c g}
- Lithium Finnamore, 1987^{i c g}
- Mimesa Shuckard, 1837^{i c g b}
- Mimumesa Malloch, 1933^{i c g b}
- Nesomimesa R. Perkins in R. Perkins and Forel, 1899^{i c g}
- Odontopsen Tsuneki, 1964^{i c g}
- Odontosphex Arnold, 1951
- Pluto Pate, 1937^{i c g}
- Psen Latreille, 1796^{i c g b}
- Pseneo Malloch, 1933^{i c g b}
- Psenulus Kohl, 1897^{i c g b} —

Data sources: i = ITIS, c = Catalogue of Life, g = GBIF, b = Bugguide.net
