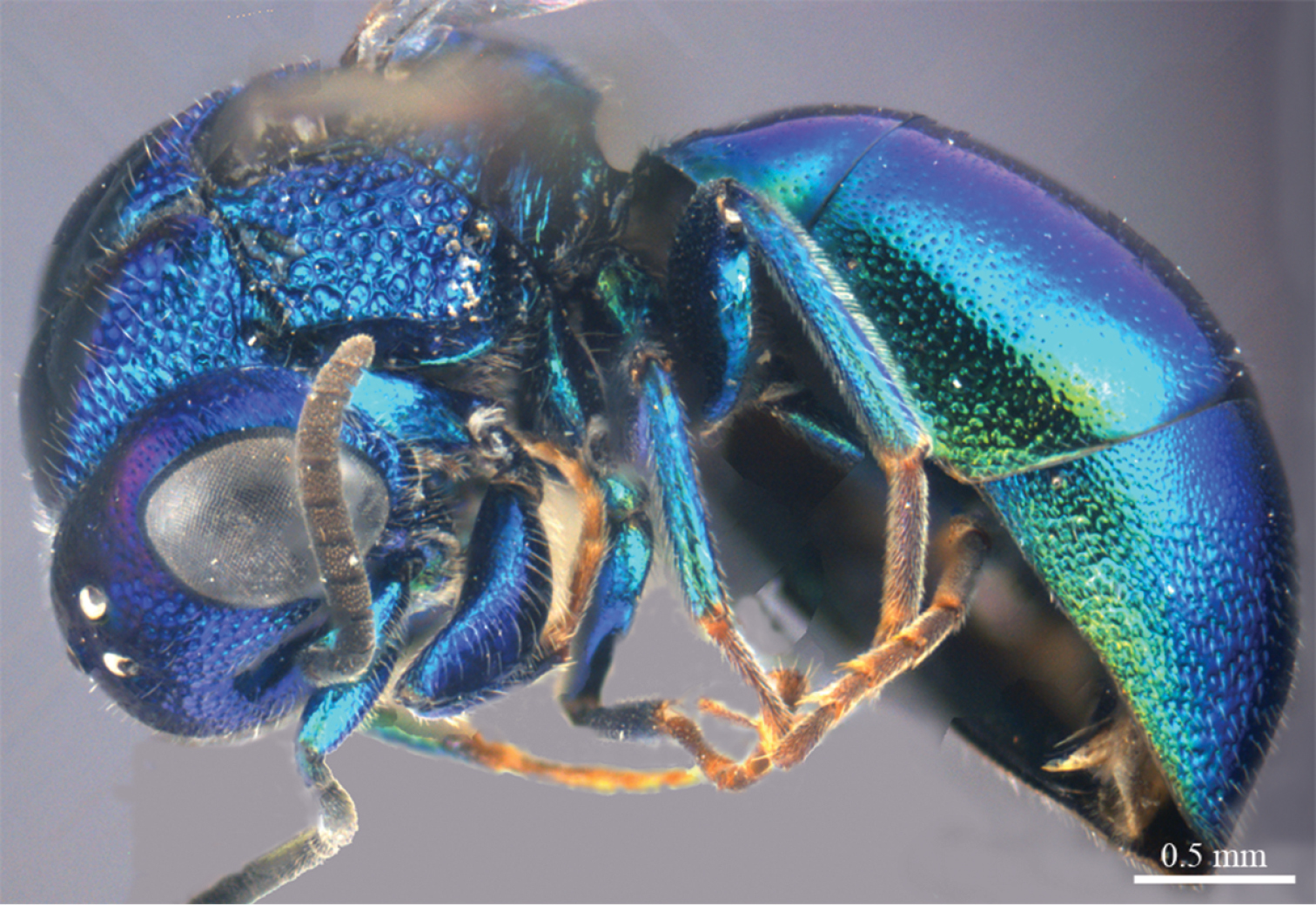
- Female
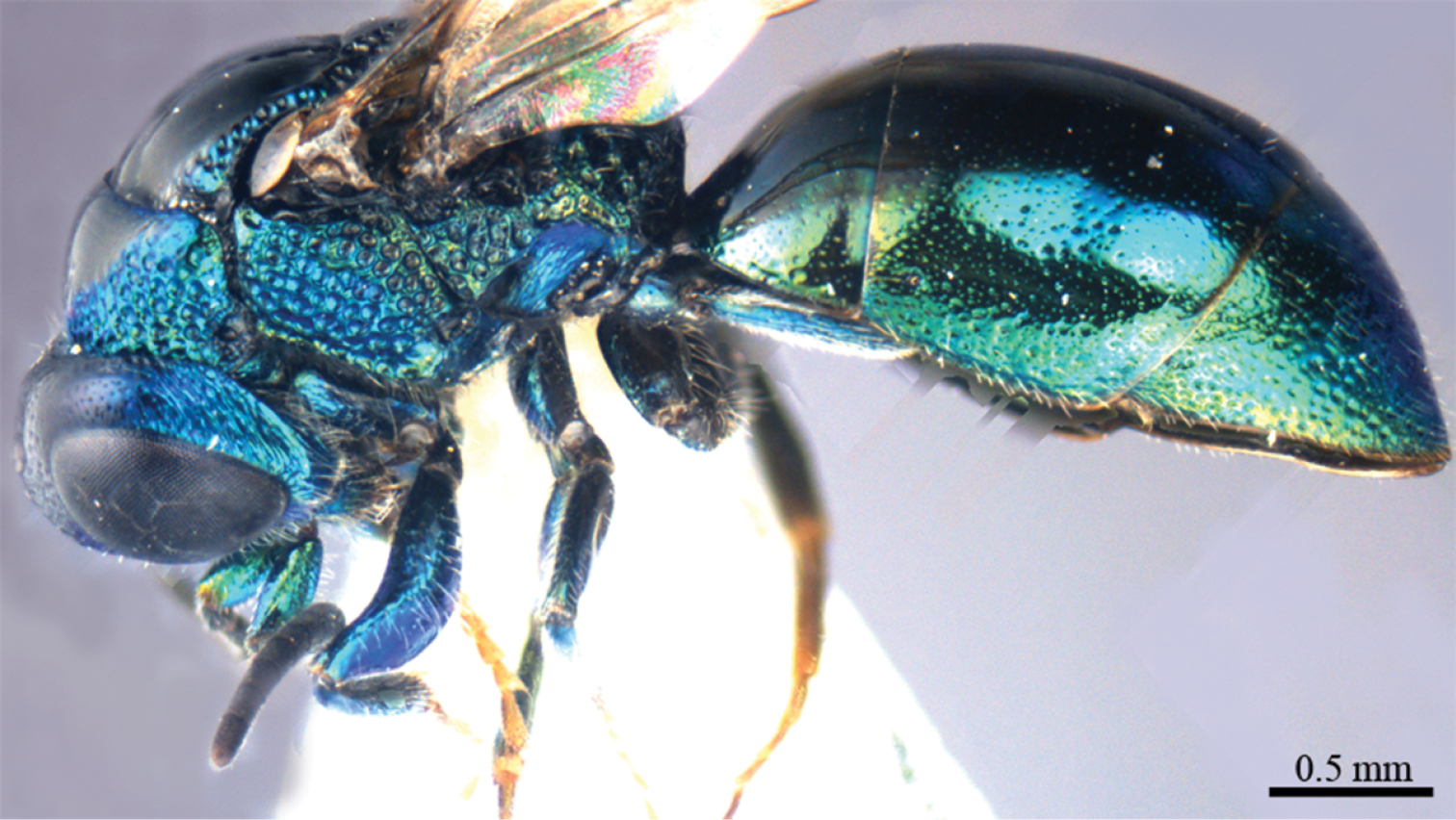
- Male

Scientific classification
- Kingdom: Animalia
- Phylum: Arthropoda
- Class: Insecta
- Order: Hymenoptera
- Family: Chrysididae
- Genus: Omalus
- Species: O. aeneus

Binomial name
- Omalus aeneus (Fabricius, 1787)

Synonyms
- Chrysis aenea Fabricius, 1787

= Omalus aeneus =

Species of wasp

Omalus aeneus is a species of cuckoo wasps belonging to the family Chrysididae.

== Subspecies ==
Subspecies include:

- Omalus aeneus aeneus (Fabricius, 1787)
- Omalus aeneus chevrieri Tournier, 1877
- Omalus aeneus japonicus (Bischoff, 1910)
- Omalus aeneus puncticollis Mocsáry, 1887

== Distribution ==
This species is present in Europe (Finland, Germany, Italy and Switzerland), in the East Palaearctic realm including China, Taiwan and Japan, in the Near East and North Africa, and in the Nearctic realm.

== Description ==
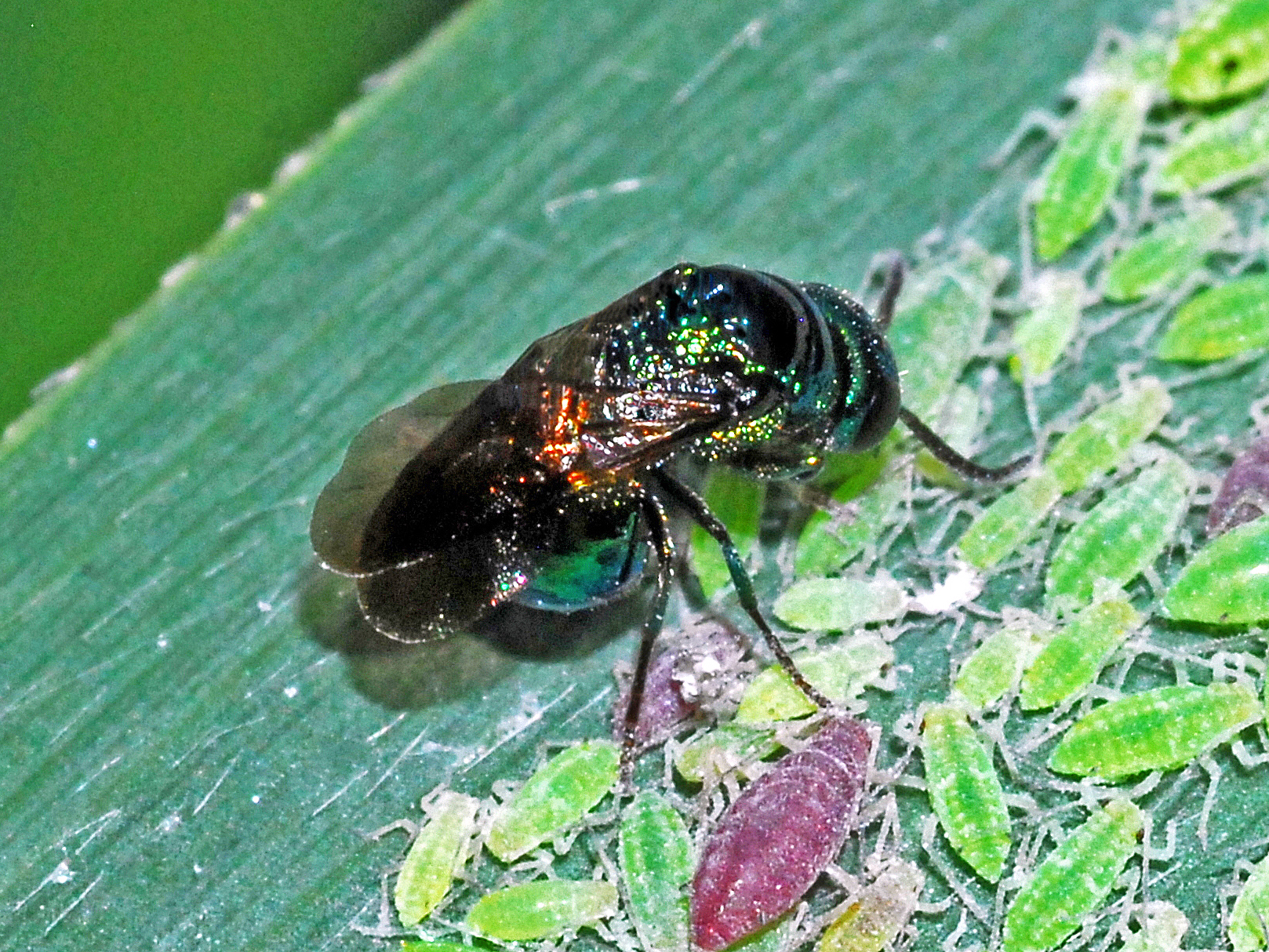
O. aeneus laying its eggs into aphids

Omalus aeneus can reach a body length of about 4.5–5.4 mm (0.18–0.21 in) in the females, while in males the length reaches 4.4–5 mm (0.17–0.20 in). The length of the front wings is 3.3–4.2 mm (0.13–0.17 in). The body color of these small wasps is blue, green, purple, sometimes almost black or golden, the abdomen and legs are greenish-blue, the tarsi are brown. Antennae are black, also the middle part of the pronotum and mesoscutum are black. Breast punctation is not deep. Antennal flagellum is not thickened in the middle. The mandibles are three-toothed and claws show 3 teeth. Hind margin of third abdominal tergite has a distinct notch. The abdomen is shiny.

== Biology ==
There are two or more generations a year in southern Europe. These wasps are nesting parasites of solitary wasps Pemphredon rufiger, Passaloecus tenuis, Passaloecus eremita, Passaloecus cuspidatus, Psenulus pallipes, Psenulus atratus and Stigmus solskyi (Crabronidae).

Similarly to Omalus biaccinctus, this species has also been reported laying eggs inside living aphids, later preyed by aphid-hunting crabronids. In such a way O. aeneus through the aphids can enter in the nest of the crabronid in order to lay its eggs.

== Bibliography ==
- Bohart, R. M. & Campos, L. E. A review of the genus Omalus Panzer in North America. (Hymenoptera, Chrysididae) - Annals of the Entomological Society of America:Entomological Society of America, 1960 - Vol. 53, no. 2.— P. 232–250.
- Bischoff, H. (1913) Hymenoptera. Fam. Chrysididae. In: Wytsman, P (Ed.), Genera insectorum. Fascicule 151. Bruxelles, L. Desmet-Verteneuil, 86 pp. + 5 pls.
- Kimsey, L.S. & Bohart, R.M. (1991 ["1990"]) The Chrysidid Wasps of the World. Oxford University Press, New York, xii + 652 pp.
- Fabricius, J.C. (1787) Mantissa Insectorum sistens eorum species nuper detectas adiectis characteribus genericis, differentiis, specificis, emendationibus, observationibus. C. G. Proft, Hafniae [= Copenhagen], 382 pp.
- Rosa, P. (2005) La collezione di Crisidi (Hymenoptera, Chrysididae) del Museo Civico di Storia Naturale di Milano. Natura, 94 (2), 1–128.
- Rosa, P. (2006) I Crisidi della Valle d’Aosta. Monografie del Museo regionale di Scienze naturali. Vol. 6. St.-Pierre, Aosta, 368 pp.
- Rosa, P. (2009) Catalogo dei tipi dei Crisidi (Hymenoptera, Chrysididae) del Museo Civico di Storia Naturale “G. Doria” di Genova. Annali del Museo Civico di Storia Naturale “G. Doria”, 100, 209–272.
- Rosa, P., Wei, N.S. & Xu, Z.F. (2014) An annotated checklist of the chrysidid wasps (Hymenoptera, Chrysididae) from China. ZooKeys, 455, 1–128. http://dx.doi.org/10.3897/zookeys.455.6557
- Wei, N.S., Rosa, P., Liu, J.X. & Xu, Z.F. (2014) The genus Omalus Panzer, 1801 (Hymenoptera, Chrysididae) from China, with descriptions of four new species. ZooKeys, 407, 29–54. http://dx.doi.org/10.3897/zookeys.407.7531
