= Aphid wasp =

Aphid wasp can refer to wasps in Apoidea:

- Ammoplanidae, a family of apoid wasps that is most sister to bees
- Pemphredonidae, a family of apoid wasps with up to 2 submarginal cells in the forewing
- Psenidae, a family of apoid wasps with 3 submarginal cells in the forewing

See also:

- Aphidiinae, a subfamily of parasitoid wasps called aphid mummy wasps
