= Pulverro costano =

Scientific classification
- Domain: Eukaryota
- Kingdom: Animalia
- Phylum: Arthropoda
- Class: Insecta
- Order: Hymenoptera
- Family: Ammoplanidae
- Genus: Pulverro
- Species: P. costano

Binomial name
- Pulverro costano Pate, 1937

Species of wasp

Pulverro costano is a species of aphid wasp in the family Ammoplanidae. It is found in North America.
