= Passaloecus monilicornis =

Scientific classification
- Domain: Eukaryota
- Kingdom: Animalia
- Phylum: Arthropoda
- Class: Insecta
- Order: Hymenoptera
- Family: Pemphredonidae
- Tribe: Pemphredonini
- Subtribe: Pemphredonina
- Genus: Passaloecus
- Species: P. monilicornis

Binomial name
- Passaloecus monilicornis Dahlbom, 1842

Species of wasp

Passaloecus monilicornis is a Palearctic species of solitary wasp.
