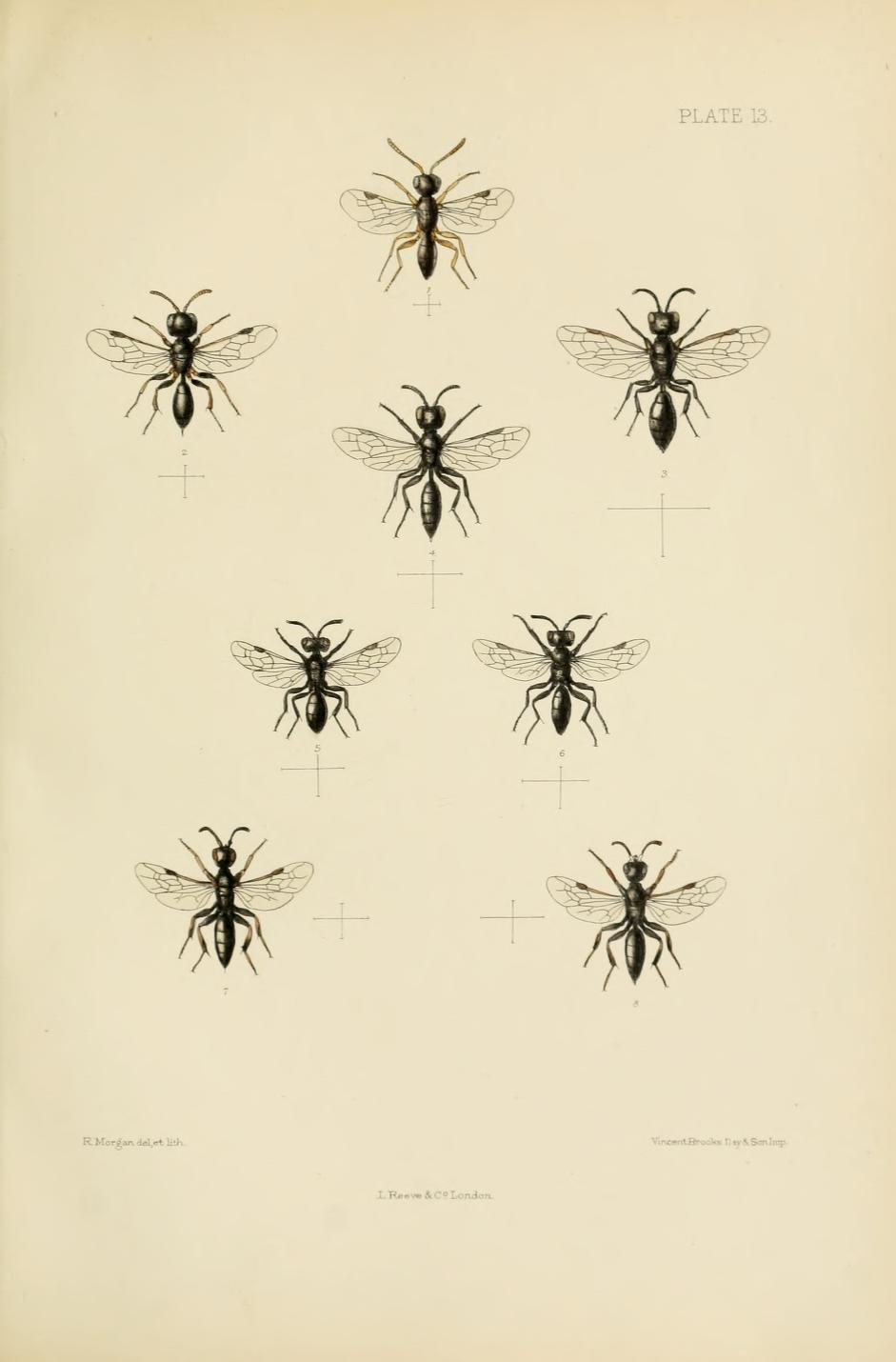
- Pemphredon lugubris in Edward Saunders The Hymenoptera Aculeata of the British Isles

Scientific classification
- Domain: Eukaryota
- Kingdom: Animalia
- Phylum: Arthropoda
- Class: Insecta
- Order: Hymenoptera
- Family: Pemphredonidae
- Tribe: Pemphredonini
- Subtribe: Pemphredonina
- Genus: Pemphredon
- Species: P. lugubris

Binomial name
- Pemphredon lugubris (Fabricius, 1793)

= Pemphredon lugubris =

Species of wasp

Pemphredon lugubris is a Palearctic species of solitary wasp.
