= Parammoplanus apache =

Scientific classification
- Domain: Eukaryota
- Kingdom: Animalia
- Phylum: Arthropoda
- Class: Insecta
- Order: Hymenoptera
- Superfamily: Apoidea
- Family: Ammoplanidae
- Genus: Parammoplanus
- Species: P. apache

Binomial name
- Parammoplanus apache (Pate, 1937)

Synonyms
- Ammoplanus apache Pate, 1937

Species of wasp

Parammoplanus apache is a species of aphid wasp in the family Ammoplanidae. It is found in North America.
