= Ammoplanus chemehuevi =

Scientific classification
- Domain: Eukaryota
- Kingdom: Animalia
- Phylum: Arthropoda
- Class: Insecta
- Order: Hymenoptera
- Superfamily: Apoidea
- Family: Ammoplanidae
- Genus: Ammoplanus
- Species: A. chemehuevi

Binomial name
- Ammoplanus chemehuevi Pate, 1943

Species of wasp

Ammoplanus chemehuevi is a species of aphid wasp in the family Ammoplanidae. It is found in North America.
