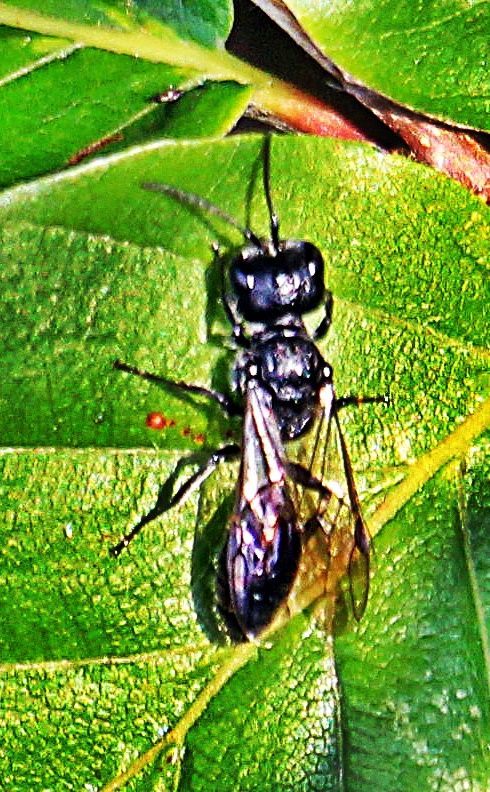

Scientific classification
- Domain: Eukaryota
- Kingdom: Animalia
- Phylum: Arthropoda
- Class: Insecta
- Order: Hymenoptera
- Family: Pemphredonidae
- Tribe: Pemphredonini
- Subtribe: Pemphredonina
- Genus: Pemphredon
- Species: P. lethifer

Binomial name
- Pemphredon lethifer (Shuckard, 1837)

= Pemphredon lethifer =

Species of wasp

Pemphredon lethifer is a Palearctic species of solitary wasp. It prefers to make nests using large twigs from the genus Sambucus.
