= Ammoplanus quabajai =

Scientific classification
- Kingdom: Animalia
- Phylum: Arthropoda
- Clade: Pancrustacea
- Class: Insecta
- Order: Hymenoptera
- Superfamily: Apoidea
- Family: Ammoplanidae
- Genus: Ammoplanus
- Species: A. quabajai

Binomial name
- Ammoplanus quabajai Pate, 1943

Species of wasp

Ammoplanus quabajai is a species of aphid wasp in the family Ammoplanidae. It is found in North America.
