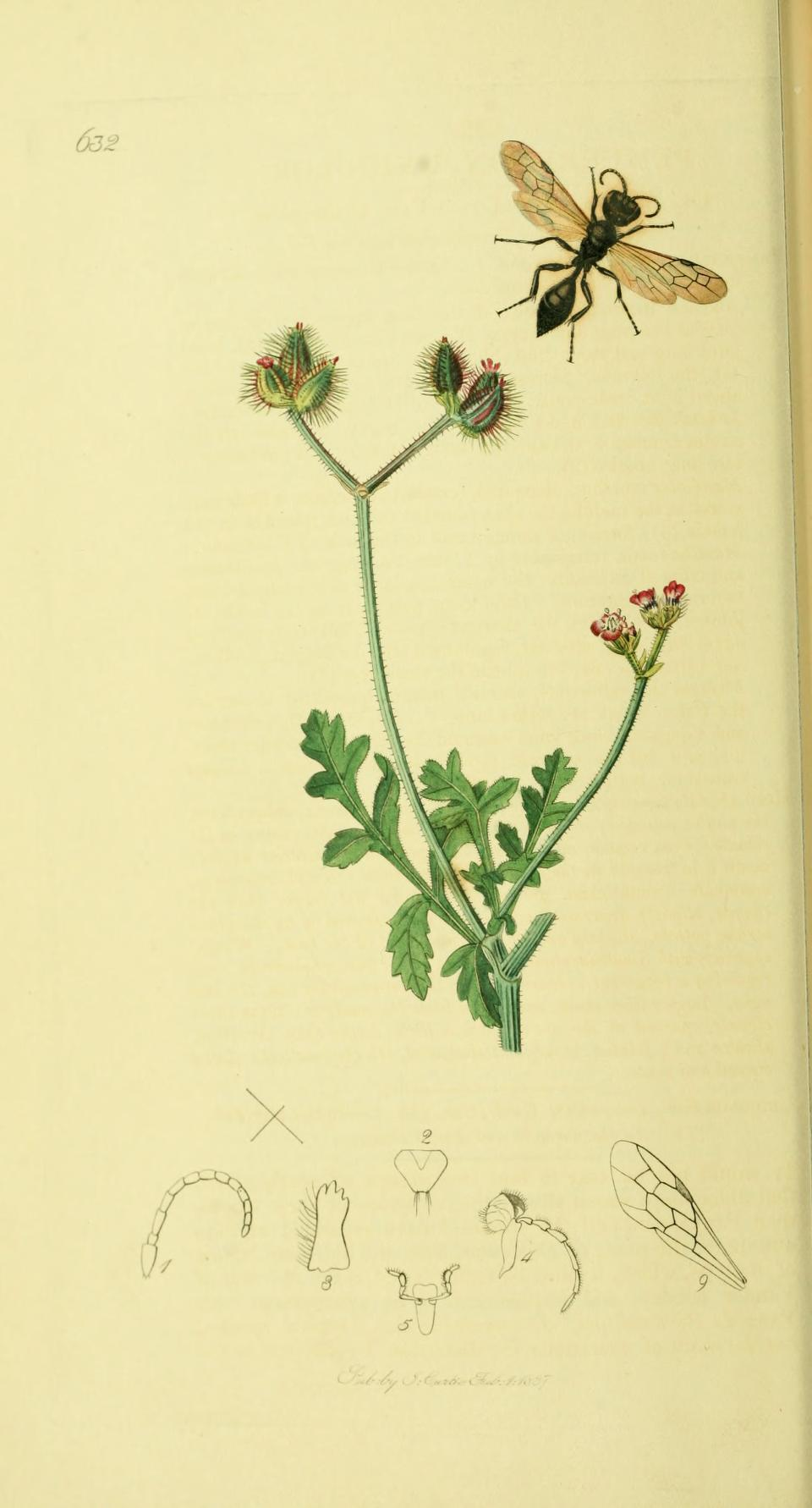

Scientific classification
- Kingdom: Animalia
- Phylum: Arthropoda
- Class: Insecta
- Order: Hymenoptera
- Family: Pemphredonidae
- Tribe: Pemphredonini
- Subtribe: Pemphredonina
- Genus: Pemphredon
- Species: P. rugifer

Binomial name
- Pemphredon rugifer (Dahlbom, 1844)

= Pemphredon rugifer =

Species of wasp

Pemphredon rugifer is a species of solitary wasp in the family Pemphredonidae. It is found in Europe, northern Asia, and Africa.
