= Stigmus americanus =

Scientific classification
- Kingdom: Animalia
- Phylum: Arthropoda
- Clade: Pancrustacea
- Class: Insecta
- Order: Hymenoptera
- Family: Pemphredonidae
- Genus: Stigmus
- Species: S. americanus

Binomial name
- Stigmus americanus Packard, 1867

Synonyms
- Stigmus fraternus coloradensis Rohwer, 1911; Stigmus lucidus Rohwer, 1909

Species of wasp

Stigmus americanus is a species of aphid wasp in the family Pemphredonidae. It is found in North America.

== Biology ==
Stigmus americanus nest in twigs of certain trees and shrubs, including Erythrina, Paeonia, Sambucus, Chionanthus, Syringa, Prunus, Polyphorus, and Sassafras. They frequently utilize pre-existing cavities, but also excavate their own nests.

A Stigmus americanus wasp provisions its nest with paralyzed aphids, and places its eggs on the thoracic ventor and abdomen of the aphids in its nest. When an egg hatches, the larva feeds on the paralyzed aphid and eventually emerges from the aphid shell as an adult wasp.

The cuckoo wasps Omalus iridescens and O. purpuratus parasitize Stigmus americanus (along some other aphid wasps) by laying eggs in live aphids at a hunting site of Stigmus americanus, which then paralyzes the aphids and moves them to its nest along with the embedded eggs.
