= Spilomena occidentalis =

Scientific classification
- Kingdom: Animalia
- Phylum: Arthropoda
- Class: Insecta
- Order: Hymenoptera
- Family: Pemphredonidae
- Tribe: Pemphredonini
- Subtribe: Spilomenina
- Genus: Spilomena
- Species: S. occidentalis

Binomial name
- Spilomena occidentalis R. Bohart in Bohart & N. Smith, 1995

Species of wasp

Spilomena occidentalis is a species of aphid wasp in the family Pemphredonidae. It is found in North America.

The Spilomena occidentalis have a dark flagellum and a white wing base. The head is oval-shaped, it is narrow at the top, and they all have short flagellomeres.
