= Spilomena hainesi =

Scientific classification
- Domain: Eukaryota
- Kingdom: Animalia
- Phylum: Arthropoda
- Class: Insecta
- Order: Hymenoptera
- Family: Pemphredonidae
- Tribe: Pemphredonini
- Subtribe: Spilomenina
- Genus: Spilomena
- Species: S. hainesi

Binomial name
- Spilomena hainesi N. Smith in R. Bohart & N. Smith, 1995

Species of wasp

Spilomena hainesi is a species of aphid wasp in the family Pemphredonidae. It is found in North America.
