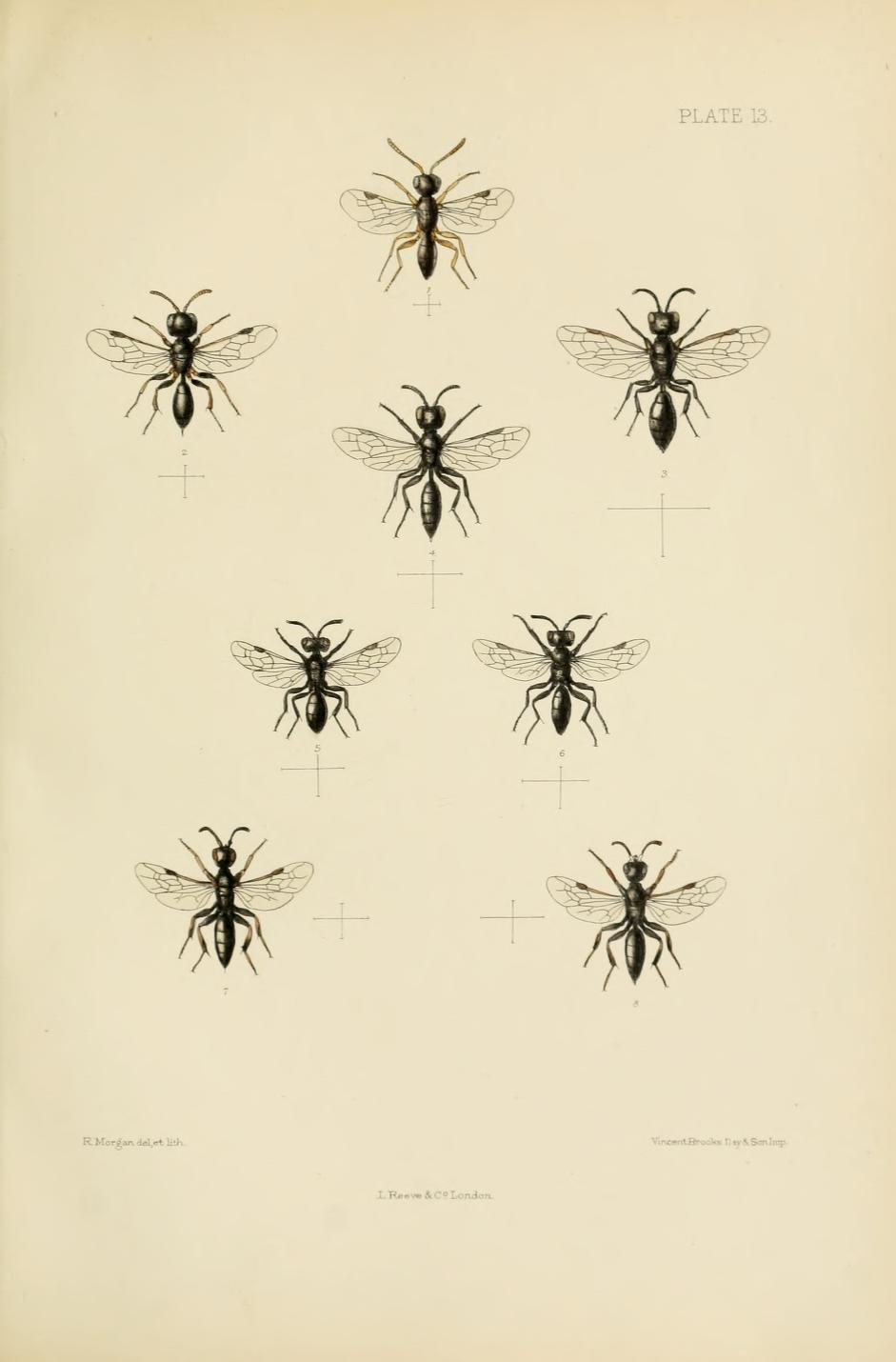
- Spilomena troglodytes in Edward Saunders 1896, The Hymenoptera Aculeata of the British Isles fig.1

Scientific classification
- Kingdom: Animalia
- Phylum: Arthropoda
- Clade: Pancrustacea
- Class: Insecta
- Order: Hymenoptera
- Family: Pemphredonidae
- Tribe: Pemphredonini
- Subtribe: Spilomenina
- Genus: Spilomena
- Species: S. troglodytes

Binomial name
- Spilomena troglodytes (Vander Linden, 1829)

= Spilomena troglodytes =

Species of wasp

Spilomena troglodytes is a Palearctic species of solitary wasp.
