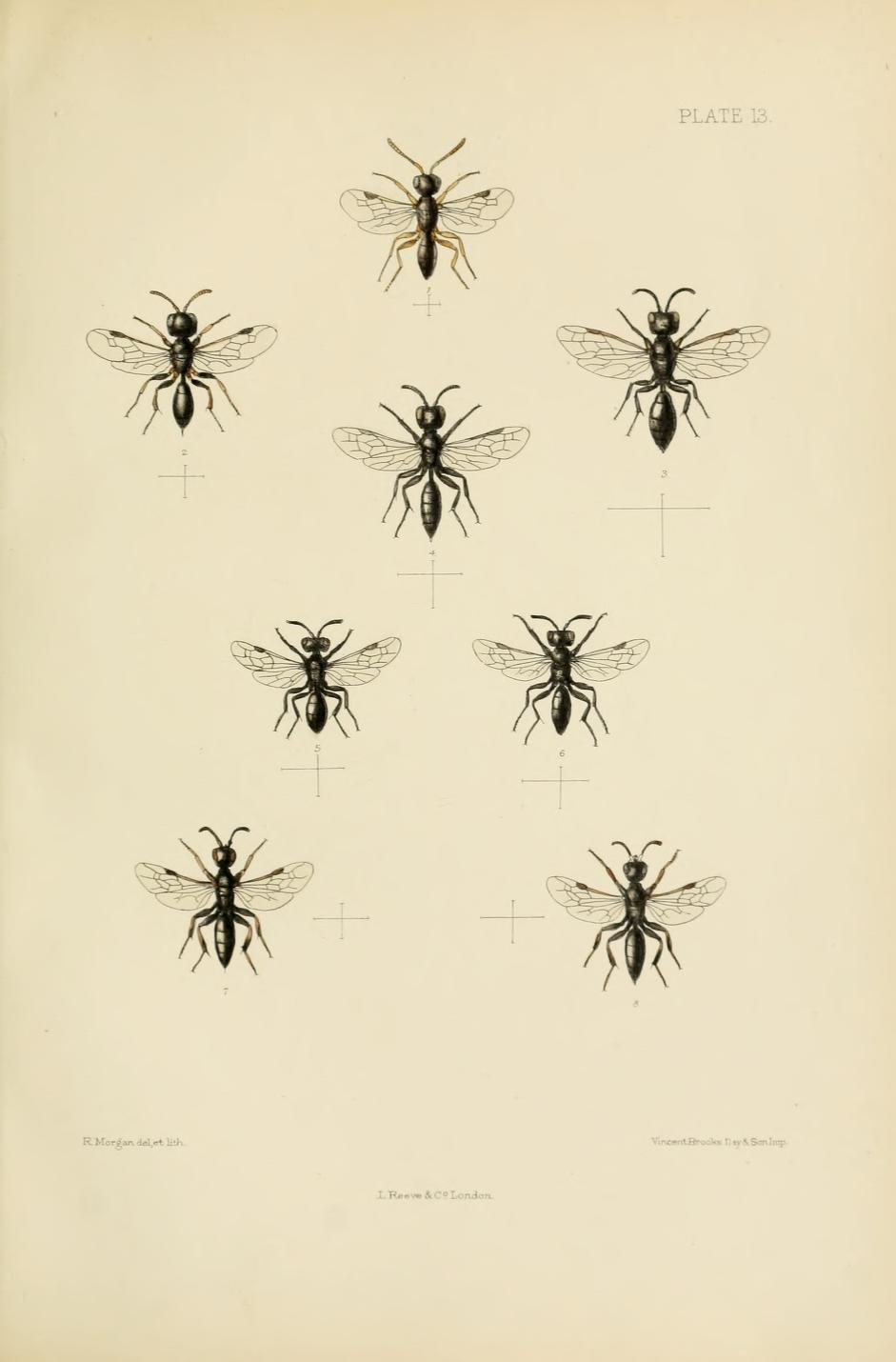
- Pemphredon inornata in Edward Saunders The Hymenoptera Aculeata of the British Islands

Scientific classification
- Kingdom: Animalia
- Phylum: Arthropoda
- Class: Insecta
- Order: Hymenoptera
- Family: Pemphredonidae
- Genus: Pemphredon
- Species: P. inornata

Binomial name
- Pemphredon inornata Say, 1824

Synonyms
- Cemonus dentatus Puton, 1871; Cemonus tenax (W. Fox, 1892); Ceratophorus tenax (W. Fox, 1892); Diphlebus tenax (W. Fox, 1892); Pemphredon dentatus (Puton, 1871); Pemphredon tenax W. Fox, 1892; Pemphredon shuckardi Cemonus shuckardi A. Morawitz, 1864

= Pemphredon inornata =

Species of wasp

Ĉ

Pemphredon inornata is a species of aphid wasp in the family Pemphredonidae. It is found in Europe and across the Palearctic (excluding China), North America, and Southern Asia.
