= Ammoplanops vierecki =

Scientific classification
- Domain: Eukaryota
- Kingdom: Animalia
- Phylum: Arthropoda
- Class: Insecta
- Order: Hymenoptera
- Superfamily: Apoidea
- Family: Ammoplanidae
- Genus: Ammoplanops
- Species: A. vierecki

Binomial name
- Ammoplanops vierecki Pate, 1939

Synonyms
- Ammoplanops foxi Pate, 1939

Species of wasp

Ammoplanops vierecki is a species of aphid wasp in the family Ammoplanidae. It is found in North America.
