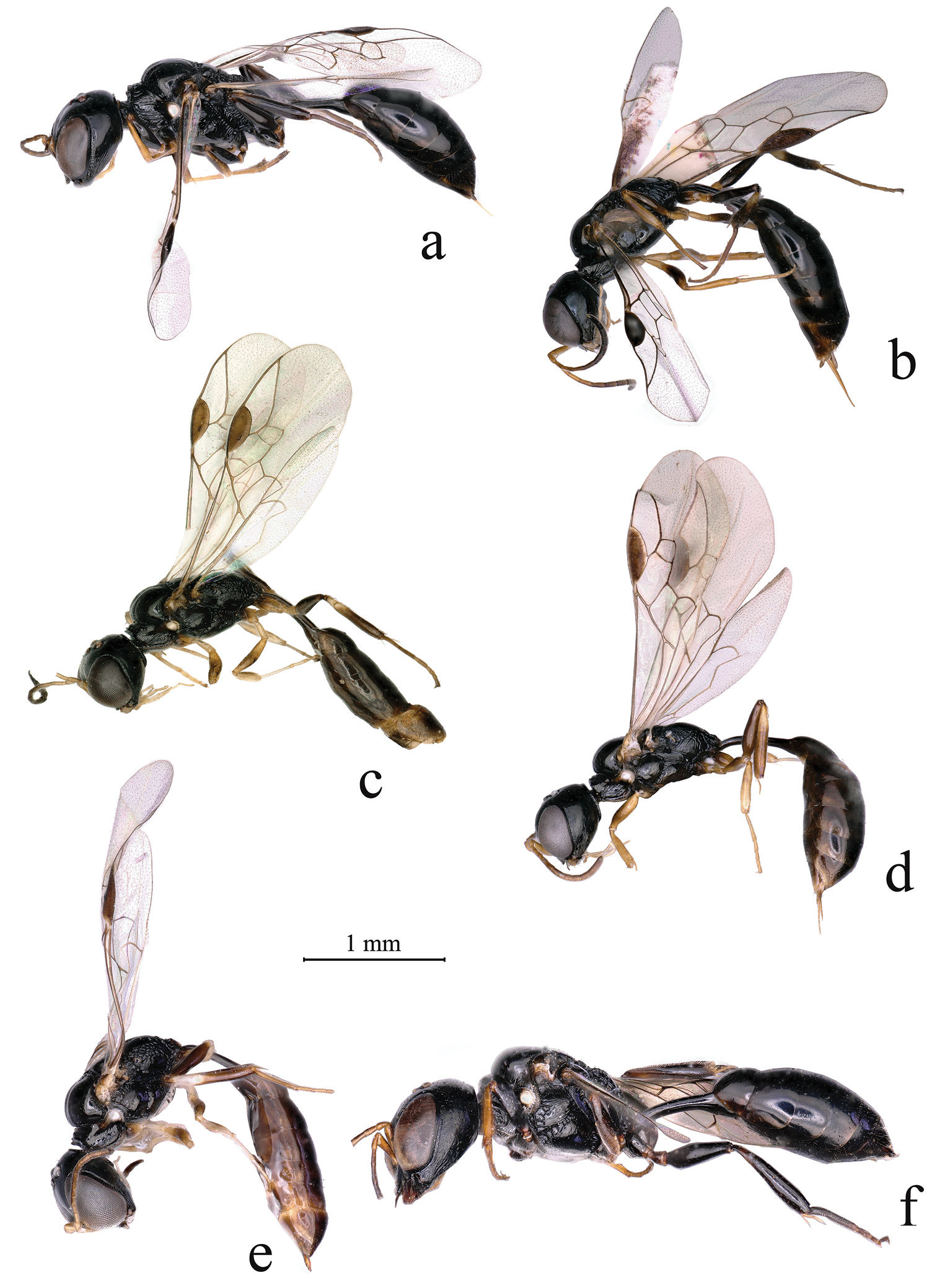
- Four species of Carinostigmus from China

Scientific classification
- Kingdom: Animalia
- Phylum: Arthropoda
- Clade: Pancrustacea
- Class: Insecta
- Order: Hymenoptera
- Family: Pemphredonidae
- Genus: Carinostigmus; Tsuneki, 1954

= Carinostigmus =

Genus of wasps

Carinostigmus is a genus of aphid wasps in the family Pemphredonidae. There are 44 described species in Carinostigmus.
