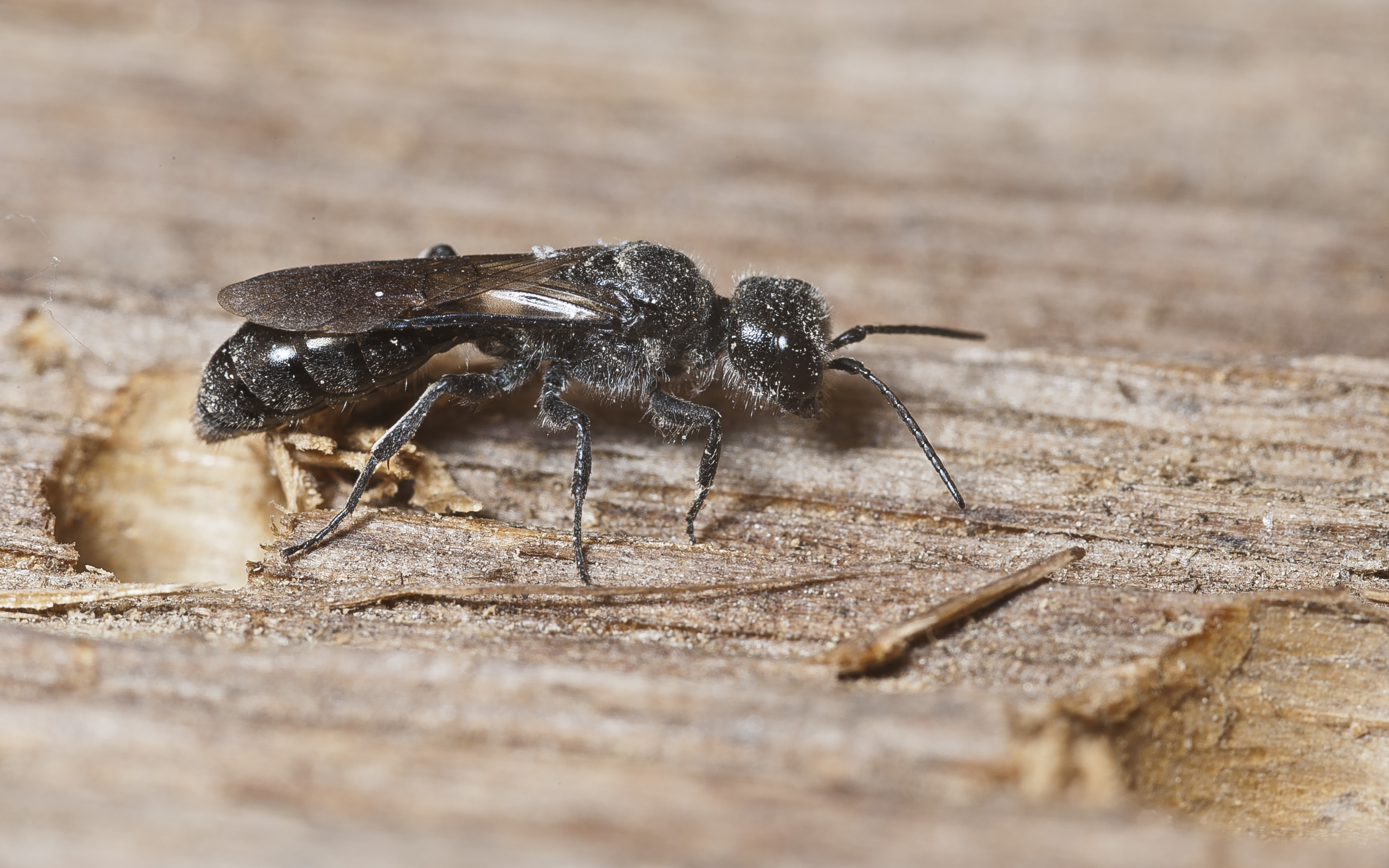
- Pemphredon sp.

Scientific classification
- Domain: Eukaryota
- Kingdom: Animalia
- Phylum: Arthropoda
- Class: Insecta
- Order: Hymenoptera
- Family: Pemphredonidae
- Subtribe: Pemphredonina
- Genus: Pemphredon; Latreille, 1796

= Pemphredon =

Genus of wasps

Pemphredon is a genus of digger wasps in the family Pemphredonidae. The genus is common in the Holarctic, with 12 species represented in Europe. Several species are considered beneficial because of their specialization in aphids.

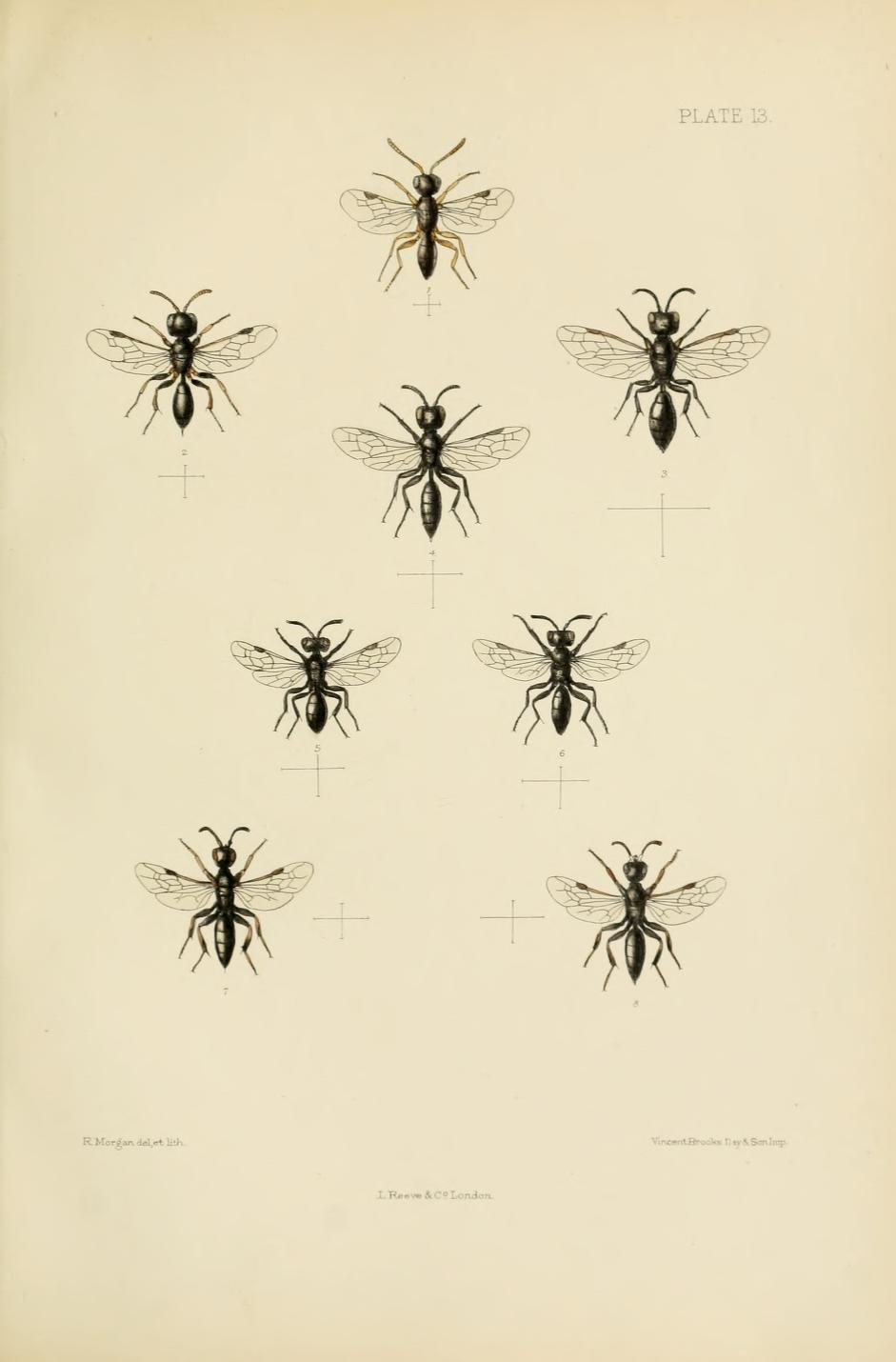
Pemphredon depicted in Edward Saunders Hymenoptera Aculeata of the British Islands

== Features ==
Pemphredon species are often small and black coloured and have some similarity with ants. They have a short, furrowed abdominal stem, two submarginal cells in the forewing and a well developed head, especially behind the compound eyes. The species identification is difficult.

Based on the course of the submarginal veins the genus is divided into three species groups, which some authors also regard as subgenera. These are the lugubris, morio and lethifer groups. In the former, the outer vein of the second submarginal cell meets the marginal cell noticeably below the middle and the second returning vein ends in the second submarginal cell, which is usually longer than wide. In the morio group, the outer vein meets the marginal cell in the middle and the second submarginal cell is wider than long. Another feature of this group is a small spike between the antennae. In the third group, the outer vein meets the marginal cell near the middle, but the second returning vein joins before or just below the second submarginal cell, which is usually the same length or longer than wide.

== Lifestyle ==
The females usually build their nests in hollow or marrowy stems or branches. Some species also use abandoned feeding tunnels in the wood or build their nests in plant galls. If there is a lack of space, the cells lie in lines one behind the other, otherwise they are branched. Short side passages are often first filled with bore dust and only later developed into cells. Each cell is supplied with 10 to 60 Aphididae, whereby the selection of the species is unspecific. The prey is either stunned with a sting or killed with the mandibles. Then they are grabbed with the mandibles and transported to the nest. When a cell is completely supplied, an egg is laid on the ground or in the middle of the cell between the prey animals. In many species, the larvae do not pupate in a complete cocoon, but in a cap over the head, which can be a thin membrane that merges into the wall of the brood cell. Some species such as Pemphredon lethifer also produce a fine second membrane just below the cap.

From the inner cells of the nest usually hatch females, from the outer males. The genus is proterandric, which means that the males hatch a few days before the females. In Central Europe, one generation per year is developed, in favourable years it can be two. The imagines of many species feed on honeydew, but sometimes also on the aphids themselves. Parasitoids of the genus are reported to be from the cuckoo wasps, ichneumon flies, Gasteruptiidae and chalcidoid wasps.

== Species (Europe) ==
- Pemphredon austriaca (Kohl 1888)
- Pemphredon baltica (Merisuo 1972)
- Pemphredon beaumonti (Hellen 1955)
- Pemphredon flavistigma (Thomson 1874)
- Pemphredon inornata (Say 1824)
- Pemphredon lethifer (Shuckard 1837)
- Pemphredon lugens (Dahlbom 1842)
- Pemphredon lugubris (Fabricius 1793)
- Pemphredon montana (Dahlbom 1845)
- Pemphredon morio (Vander Linden 1829)
- Pemphredon podagrica (Chevrier 1870)
- Pemphredon rugifer (Dahlbom 1844)
