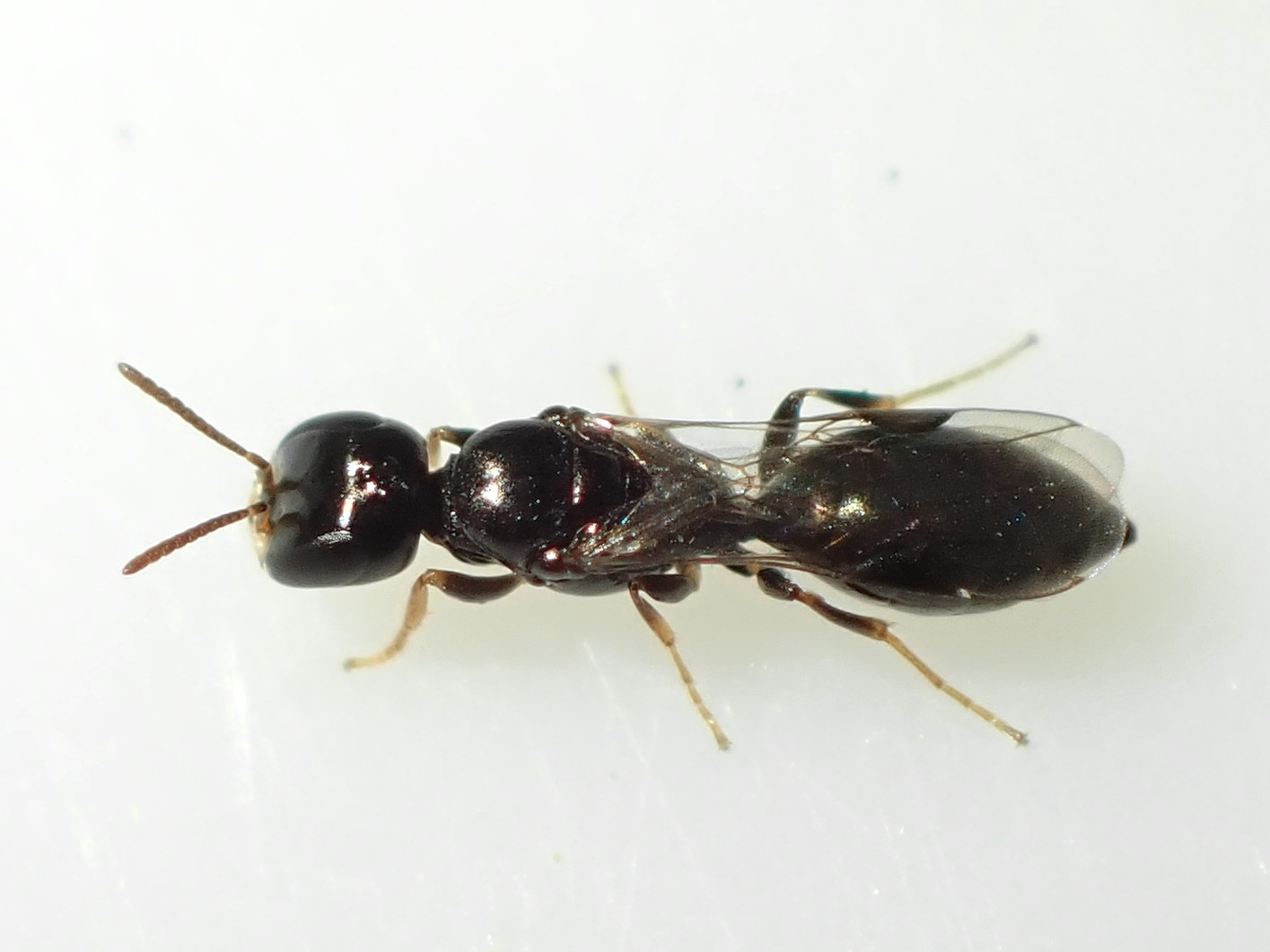

Scientific classification
- Kingdom: Animalia
- Phylum: Arthropoda
- Class: Insecta
- Order: Hymenoptera
- Family: Pemphredonidae
- Subtribe: Spilomenina
- Genus: Spilomena; Shuckard, 1838

Synonyms
- Microglossa Rayment, 1930; Microglossella Rayment, 1935; Taialia Tsuneki, 1971

= Spilomena =

Genus of wasps

Spilomena is a genus of aphid wasps in the family Pemphredonidae. The 86 species are found worldwide, being represented in the Palearctic (highest number of species), Nearctic, Afrotropical, Neotropical, Australasian, and Indomalayan realms.

== Species ==
These 88 species belong to the genus Spilomena:

- Spilomena acutitemporis Antropov, 1992^{i c g}
- Spilomena alboclypeata Bradley, 1906^{i c g}
- Spilomena alini Antropov, 1991^{i c g}
- Spilomena ampliceps Krombein, 1952^{i c g}
- Spilomena arania Leclercq, 1961^{i c g}
- Spilomena argentina Antropov, 1992^{i c g}
- Spilomena atrata Antropov, 1993^{i c g}
- Spilomena ausiana Leclercq, 1959^{i c g}
- Spilomena australis R. Turner, 1910^{i c g}
- Spilomena bakeri R. Bohart in Bohart and N. Smith, 1995^{i c g}
- Spilomena barberi Krombein, 1962^{i c g}
- Spilomena beata Blüthgen, 1953^{i c g} (Europe)
- Spilomena bicuspidata Antropov, 1993^{i c g}
- Spilomena bimaculata (Rayment, 1930)^{i c g}
- Spilomena brasiliensis Antropov, 1991^{i c g}
- Spilomena canariensis Bischoff, 1937^{i c g} (Europe)
- Spilomena catamarca Antropov, 1992^{i c g}
- Spilomena chilensis Herbst, 1920^{i c g}
- Spilomena clypearis N. Smith in R. Bohart and N. Smith, 1995^{i c g}
- Spilomena clypei Li and He, 1998^{i c g}
- Spilomena curruca (Dahlbom, 1844)^{i c g} (Europe)
- Spilomena dedzcli Tsuneki, 1971^{i c g}
- Spilomena differens Blüthgen, 1953^{i c g} (Europe)
- Spilomena djozankeiana Tsuneki, 1986^{i c g}
- Spilomena dyeri Antropov, 1993^{i c g}
- Spilomena earlyi Harris, 1994^{i c g}
- Spilomena elegantula R. Turner, 1916^{i c g}
- Spilomena elephantodeta Simon Thomas, 1995^{i c g}
- Spilomena emarginata Vardy, 1987^{i c g}
- Spilomena enslini Blüthgen, 1953^{i c g} (Europe)
- Spilomena formosana (Tsuneki, 1971)^{i c g}
- Spilomena foxii Cresson, 1897^{i c g}
- Spilomena fresno N. Smith in R. Bohart and N. Smith, 1995^{i c g}
- Spilomena fulvicornis Gussakovskij, 1931^{i c g}
- Spilomena hainesi N. Smith in R. Bohart & N. Smith, 1995^{i c g b}
- Spilomena hobartia R. Turner, 1914^{i c g}
- Spilomena indostana R. Turner, 1918^{i c g}
- Spilomena iridescens R. Turner, 1916^{i c g}
- Spilomena jacobsoni Maidl, 1925^{i c g}
- Spilomena japonica Tsuneki, 1956^{i c g}
- Spilomena kaszabi Tsuneki, 1972^{i c g}
- Spilomena kelso R. Bohart in Bohart and N. Smith, 1995^{i c g}
- Spilomena kimseyae Antropov, 1993^{i c g}
- Spilomena koikensis Tsuneki, 1971^{i c g}
- Spilomena laeviceps Tsuneki, 1956^{i c g}
- Spilomena leucostigma R. Bohart in Bohart and N. Smith, 1995^{i c g}
- Spilomena longiceps R. Turner, 1916^{i c g}
- Spilomena longifrons (Rayment, 1930)^{i c g}
- Spilomena luteiventris R. Turner, 1936^{i c g}
- Spilomena maghrebensis Dollfuss, 1983^{i c g}
- Spilomena menkei R. Bohart in Bohart and N. Smith, 1995^{i c g}
- Spilomena merceti Arnold, 1923^{i c g}
- Spilomena mocsaryi Kohl, 1898^{i c g} (Europe)
- Spilomena mongolica Tsuneki, 1972^{i c g}
- Spilomena montana R. Bohart in Bohart and N. Smith, 1995^{i c g}
- Spilomena nasuta Antropov, 1993^{i c g}
- Spilomena nigrifrons Simon Thomas, 1995^{i c g}
- Spilomena nozela Vardy, 1987^{i c g}
- Spilomena obliterata R. Turner, 1914^{i c g}
- Spilomena obscurior Gussakovskij, 1952^{i c g}
- Spilomena occidentalis R. Bohart in Bohart & N. Smith, 1995^{i c g b}
- Spilomena palawanensis Tsuneki, 1976^{i c g}
- Spilomena peruensis Dollfuss, 1982^{i c g}
- Spilomena pondola Leclercq, 1959^{i c g}
- Spilomena punctatissima Blüthgen, 1953^{i c g} (Europe)
- Spilomena pusilla (Say, 1837)^{i c g}
- Spilomena quinteroi Antropov and Cambra, 2004^{i c g}
- Spilomena rhytithoracica Li and He, 1998^{i c g}
- Spilomena robusta Arnold, 1927^{i c g}
- Spilomena roshanica Gussakovskij, 1952^{i c g}
- Spilomena rossi Antropov, 1993^{i c g}
- Spilomena rudesculpta Gussakovskij, 1952^{i c g}
- Spilomena rufitarsus (Rayment, 1930)^{i c g}
- Spilomena schlingeri Antropov, 1993^{i c g}
- Spilomena seyrigi Arnold, 1945^{i c g}
- Spilomena socialis Matthews in Turillazzi et al., 2014^{i g}
- Spilomena spinosa Antropov, 1993^{i c g}
- Spilomena stangei Antropov, 1992^{i c g}
- Spilomena stevensoni Arnold, 1924^{i c g}
- Spilomena subterranea McCorquodale and Naumann, 1988^{i c g}
- Spilomena troglodytes (Vander Linden, 1829)^{i c g} (Europe)
- Spilomena tungurachua Antropov, 1993^{i c g}
- Spilomena turneri Arnold, 1927^{i c g}
- Spilomena vagans Blüthgen, 1953^{g}
- Spilomena valkeilai Vikberg, 2000^{i c g} (Europe)
- Spilomena willinki Antropov, 1992^{i c g}
- Spilomena wittei Leclercq, 1959^{i c g}
- Spilomena zhejiangana Li and He, 1998^{i c g}

Data sources: i = ITIS, c = Catalogue of Life, g = GBIF, b = Bugguide.net
