= Diodontus =

Scientific classification
- Domain: Eukaryota
- Kingdom: Animalia
- Phylum: Arthropoda
- Class: Insecta
- Order: Hymenoptera
- Family: Pemphredonidae
- Subtribe: Pemphredonina
- Genus: Diodontus; Curtis, 1834

Genus of insects

Diodontus is a genus of wasp belonging to the family Pemphredonidae. The species of this genus are found in Europe, Africa and Northern America.

Species:

- Diodontus adamsi Titus, 1909
- Diodontus afer Morice, 1911

See taxa listed at: Diodontus, per California Academy of Sciences Institute of Biodiversity. Accessed 10 January 2025
