= Passaloecus cuspidatus =

Scientific classification
- Kingdom: Animalia
- Phylum: Arthropoda
- Clade: Pancrustacea
- Class: Insecta
- Order: Hymenoptera
- Family: Pemphredonidae
- Genus: Passaloecus
- Species: P. cuspidatus

Binomial name
- Passaloecus cuspidatus F. Smith, 1856

Synonyms
- Passaloecus dispar Cresson, 1865; Passaloecus distinctus (Cresson, 1865); Passaloecus mandibularis W. Fox, 1892; Pemphredon mandibularis W. Fox, 1892

Species of wasp

Passaloecus cuspidatus is a species of aphid wasp in the family Pemphredonidae. It is found in North America. It builds its nest with pine resin.
