= Microstigmus =

Scientific classification
- Kingdom: Animalia
- Phylum: Arthropoda
- Class: Insecta
- Order: Hymenoptera
- Family: Pemphredonidae
- Subtribe: Spilomenina
- Genus: Microstigmus; Ducke, 1907

Genus of wasps

Microstigmus, or the thin-waisted social wasps, is a small genus of wasps in the family Pemphredonidae. Species of the genus are found in the Neotropical realm from Central to South America. They build nests and live in colonies ranging in size from 1 to 18 members. Microstigmus is widely considered to be the only true eusocial species of apoid wasp.

== Biology ==
The species of Microstigmus ranges in length from 2.5 to 5.5 millimetres (0.098 to 0.217 in). Unlike other Hymenoptera, the head and thorax lack branched or plumose hairs. The wasps also have their posterior metatarsus modified into a cleaning mechanism.

Apoid wasps also have a silk gland in the abdomen, which in the Pemphredonidae is used for nest building. In Microstigmus, the gland cells each have a singular nucleus and form a conducting canal. Bristles at the end function as spinnerets. This epidermal gland evolved independently for most species under the Pemphredoninae subfamily.

== Diet ==
As with most wasp species, those in the genus Microstigmus are predators. Prey for the wasps can vary from flies to aphids. Most of the time, the kill is performed with the powerful mandibles literally biting through the head of the prey causing either death or immobilization. Social wasps will kill the prey and then return to the nest to provide for the young. This can be done in several ways. One is for the wasp to suck out the inner bodily fluids of the prey and carry the hemolymph back to the nest where the adults will regurgitate some of the fluids to the larva wherein the adult retains some of the hemolymph. This trophallaxis between adults and larva may have played a role in social wasp evolution in three primary ways. Adults who provide nourishment for larva and get food in return may reduce the need to forage for food for themselves. Therefore, flights from the nests may be more efficient where flights are only performed for larval food foraging and nest construction materials over species that do not practice trophallaxis. The larval-adult saliva exchange may also increase reproductive fitness in females. An example would be a period of inclement weather where food is hard to come by. The reproducing females would still have a source of nutrition and be able to continue reproductive cycles which are crucial in eusocial colonies. There might also be a situation where the trophallaxis benefits the adults but also hinders the larva in form of nutritional castration where the lack of food results in underdeveloped reproductive organs thus leading to the creation of a worker class.

== Nesting ==
Nests generally have a rough external appearance with a brownish-gray hue although some species have a whitish appearance with smooth texture. Species usually form communal nests that hang from a strong support such as a tree branch, vine, or overhanging rock formation via a petiole which is produced from a root tip rather than silk. The nests are typically built with substrate surface material such as bark, lichens, and sand grains interlaced with silky secretion produced by the female wasps. The nests are developed into conical structures approximately 12 mm in length. Most of the infant holding cells are the near the bottom and the adults reside in the upper hollow section of the next close to the entrance. The interior of the entrance is covered by a translucent coating. In most instances the beginnings of the nest are created all by a single queen wasp that decides to spawn more workers once the nest has reached a certain size (generally the size of a walnut). While most social insects build their nests over time gradually increasing in size, the Microstigmus construct the entire confines of the nest in one effort and thus the workers and queen are confined to the nest until it is fully completed. As such all of the construction materials are gathered prior to the building of the nest as seen with Microstigmus comes.

== Behavior ==
=== Larva interaction ===
As Microstigmus is a social genus that lives together in a colony, larval care is provided by adults. In Microstigmus thysanoptera, the adults form a compact mass of prey provisions and silk fibers which, upon hatching, the larva consumes. The fecal matter produced by the larva that have molted is removed from the nest along with other trash by the adults performing housekeeping duties. Larval incubation habits indicate the sociality among wasps, as females will routinely bring food to the same incubation cell in a cooperative effort. Social divisions also reveal the specialization of roles and thus how each individual contributes to the overall colony. No two eggs are at the same stage of development and only one egg is available for care at any given time. This is supported by the fact that there is only one female with significantly larger ovaries over the other females at any given time and this select female is considered the primary egg layer.

The anatomy of Microstigmus larvae has unique evolutionary characteristics. One is the conical supranal process which is potentially an adaptation for obtaining the prey provisions stuck on the walls of a nursery cell. During the larval stage, there also is a complete lack of spinnerets which indicate that a pupal stage with a cocoon is not present in some species of Microstigmus (M. xylicola nests have been found with pupa present). The spinulose lobe of the mandible is not like most and is a possible modification for ingestion of collembolans. Other aspects of Microstigmus biology are shared with other genera in the family Pemphredonidae such as antennal papillae, lack of galeae, and tridentate mandibles which indicate close relation to Spilomena and distant from Ammoplanus.

=== Adult/nest interaction ===
A typical worker female exhibits repetition of select behaviors, mainly with a purpose of sustaining the colony. They would forage for food for the young which can range from decaying dead insects and bodily fluids of paralyzed insects to decaying fruit. Adults usually feed off nectar as their primary source of nourishment but in some colonies such as M. nigrophthalmus the adults feed off the secretion of the larva (a form of defecation). Adults deliver the food to the young through a process called trophallaxis. Adults also inspect the nest, clean by ejecting excess material, and silk which is reinforcement of the nest structure through adding silk to the petiole. More rarely, individuals would partake in nest defense, usually from small arthropods, and mate where a female and a male would exit the nest joined at the genitalia.

Before leaving the nest, the adults generally make an inspection walk around the nest and will also perform the same task upon returning, generally to make sure the nest is in good order and not damaged in any way. Another potential reason for the inspection routine could be to check for parasites around the nest. Along with the inspections, adults also perform the maintenance routes where the wasps remove particles and waste and check the integrity of the nest. Females occasionally will apply silk to reinforce the nest surface, pedicel and attachment point between the leaf and pedicel.

=== Eusociality ===
In some species, social altruism is visible; however, studies on these topics have been limited. The small size and enclosed nest structure makes it difficult to obtain significant data. In colonies of wasps with more than one adult, one adult would almost always remain at the nest site while the others would go out and forage for food or construction materials. Nest defense are also done together with most of the females congregating around the nest during an attack.

Eusocial insects typically discriminate against non-nest members. However, in M. thripoctenus, tolerance of non-related individuals was observed, and may have some social benefit. One hypothesis and is that in a solitary nest where more members can provide more work, the additional help is kept around in order to benefit the overall fitness of the colony. A second hypothesis is that additional members would increase the longevity of the nest as it is theorized that each wasp is only capable of so much silk production which is the key building block in nest construction.

Kin selection based on Hamiliton’s Rule provides an explanation to the population genetics framework and specifies the patterns of local and family genetic makeup that results in the most favorable outcome. The key to this is that the genetic structure spawns nonrandom genotypes which coupled with differential reproduction makes kin selection possible. Inter-nest relatedness was high resulting in few independent haploid genomes which makes possible the development of a social hierarchy.

== Relatedness ==
Between the females within a nest, relatedness was very high and contributes to altruistic behavior in an effort to support the survivability of the brood regardless of whether the brood is one’s own offspring or not. Additionally, the nest has a group effort toward raising brood members due to the high cost of constructing where females have to invest, time, effort, and energy in order to produce and maintain a nest. Relatedness between individuals drastically decreases over a few generations and as such, mating in Microstigmus colonies tend to be low to the point where it is not uncommon to see a nest with only one female with fully functioning ovaries. Reproduction within Microstigmus nests from various subspecies where some has a queen-worker divide and the queen's sole purpose is to reproduce, while others have specific females rear the offspring.

== Species ==
These 29 species belong to the genus Microstigmus:

- Microstigmus adelphus Richards, 1972
- Microstigmus alini Antropov, 1992
- Microstigmus arlei Richards, 1972
- Microstigmus bicolor Richards, 1971
- Microstigmus brasiliensis Melo, 1992
- Microstigmus brunniventris Rohwer, 1923
- Microstigmus comes Krombein, 1967
- Microstigmus cooperi Melo and Matthews, 1997
- Microstigmus crucifex Melo and Matthews, 1997
- Microstigmus eberhardi Richards, 1971
- Microstigmus flavus Melo and Matthews, 1997
- Microstigmus guianensis Rohwer, 1923
- Microstigmus hingstoni Richards, 1932
- Microstigmus krombeini Matthews, 1996
- Microstigmus lobifex Richards, 1972
- Microstigmus luederwaldti Richards, 1972
- Microstigmus miconiae Richards, 1972
- Microstigmus myersi R. Turner, 1929
- Microstigmus nigrophthalmus Melo, 1992
- Microstigmus pallidus Richards, 1972
- Microstigmus puncticeps Melo and Matthews, 1997
- Microstigmus similis Melo in Melo and Evans, 1993
- Microstigmus simplex Melo in Melo and Evans, 1993
- Microstigmus soror Richards, 1972
- Microstigmus theridii Ducke, 1907
- Microstigmus thripoctenus Richards in Matthews, 1970
- Microstigmus wagneri du Buysson, 1907
- Microstigmus xanthosceles Melo and Matthews, 1997
- Microstigmus xylicola Melo in Melo and Evans, 1993
