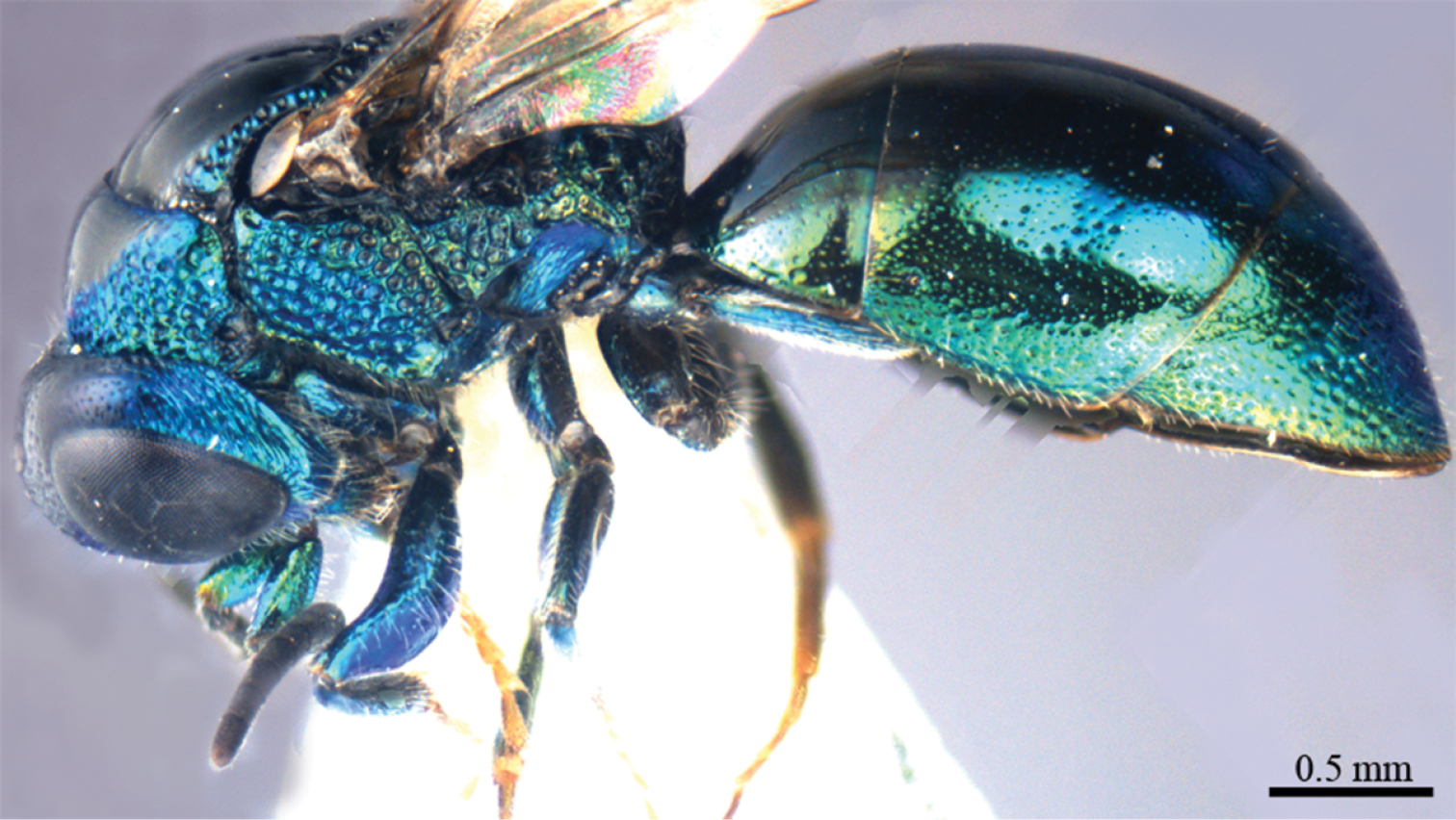
- Omalus aeneus

Scientific classification
- Kingdom: Animalia
- Phylum: Arthropoda
- Class: Insecta
- Order: Hymenoptera
- Family: Chrysididae
- Tribe: Elampini
- Genus: Omalus; Panzer, 1804

= Omalus =

Genus of wasps

Omalus is a genus of cuckoo wasps in the family Chrysididae.

== Selected species ==
Species within this genus include:

- Omalus aeneus (Fabricius, 1787)
- Omalus biaccinctus (R. du Buysson, 1892)
- Omalus chlorosomus Lucas 1849
- Omalus nigromaculatus Linsenmaier, 1997
- Omalus politus R. du Buysson, 1887

== Biography ==
- Bohart, R.M. & Campos, L.E. (1960) A review of the genus Omalus Panzer in North America. (Hymenoptera, Chrysididae). — Annals of the Entomological Society of America, 53 (2), 232–250.
