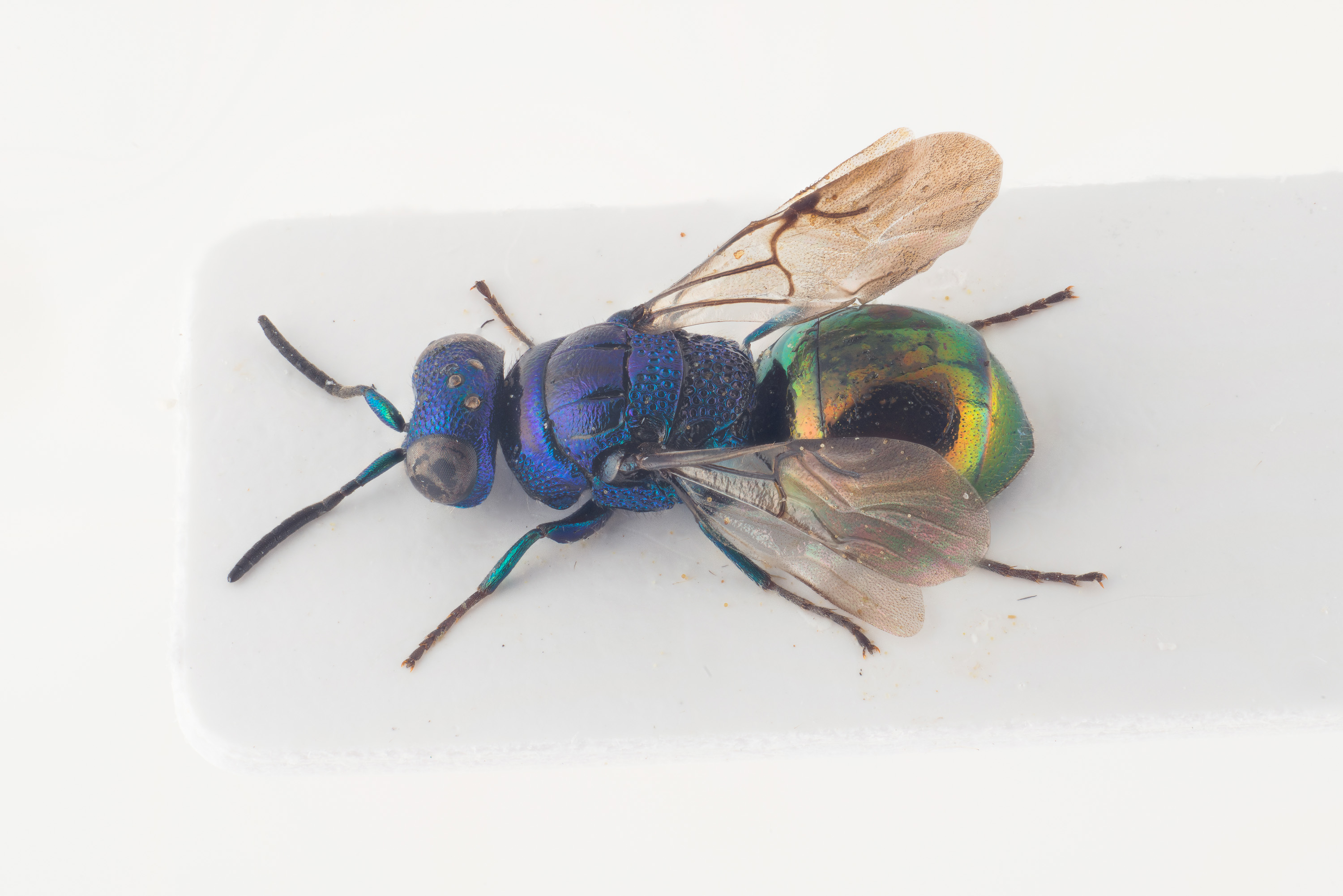

Scientific classification
- Kingdom: Animalia
- Phylum: Arthropoda
- Class: Insecta
- Order: Hymenoptera
- Family: Chrysididae
- Genus: Omalus
- Species: O. biaccinctus

Binomial name
- Omalus biaccinctus (R. du Buysson, 1893)

Synonyms
- Ellampus biaccinctus Du Buysson, 1892

= Omalus biaccinctus =

Species of wasp

Omalus biaccinctus is a species of cuckoo wasps belonging to the family Chrysididae.

== Distribution and habitat ==
This species is present in most of Europe (Austria, Belarus, Belgium, Croatia, Czech Republic, Denmark, Estonia, Finland, France, Germany, Greece, Hungary, Italy, Luxembourg, Poland, Spain, Switzerland and The Netherlands), in the eastern Palearctic realm, and in the Near East. These wasps occur in musk forests.

== Description ==
Omalus biaccinctus can reach a body length of about 4 mm (0.16 in). In these small wasps head, pronotum and mesonotum are unpunctuated but vaguely rough. The face is green-blue and antennae are brown, with the first two segments green. The thorax is blue-indigo and very convex. The abdomen is shiny golden-red, subglobular and wider than the fore-body. Wings are quite smoky in the rear half. Legs are blue-green and tarsi reddish-brown, but the first section is green.

== Biology ==
These wasps are nesting parasites of solitary wasps Passaloecus species. This species has also been reported laying eggs inside living aphids, later preyed by aphid-hunting crabronids. In such a way O. biaccinctus through the aphids can enter in the nest of the crabronid in order to lay its eggs.
