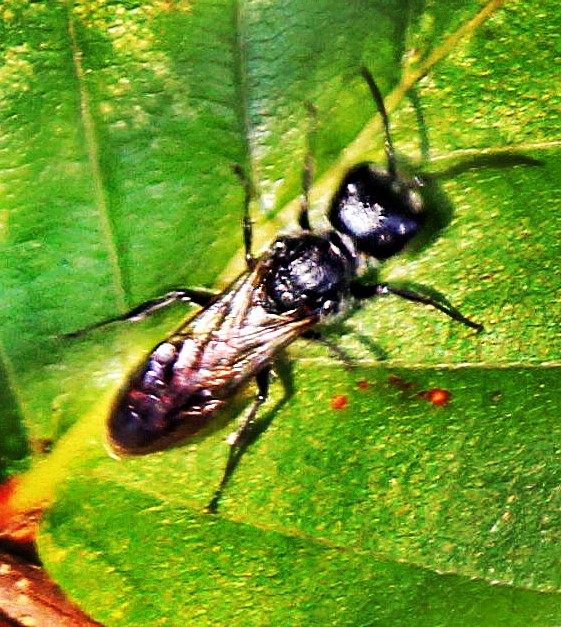
- Stigmus solskyi

Scientific classification
- Kingdom: Animalia
- Phylum: Arthropoda
- Clade: Pancrustacea
- Class: Insecta
- Order: Hymenoptera
- Family: Pemphredonidae
- Tribe: Pemphredonini
- Subtribe: Stigmina
- Genus: Stigmus; Panzer, 1804

Synonyms
- Atopostigmus Krombein, 1973; Gonostigmus Rohwer, 1911

= Stigmus =

Genus of wasps

Stigmus is a genus of aphid wasps in the family Pemphredonidae. There are more than 20 described species in Stigmus.

== Species ==
These species belong to the genus Stigmus:

- Stigmus americanus Packard, 1867
- Stigmus aphideperda Rohwer
- Stigmus aphidiperda Rohwer, 1911
- Stigmus convergens Tsuneki, 1954
- Stigmus cuculus Dudgeon in Nurse, 1903
- Stigmus dentiserratus Li & Ma, 2026
- Stigmus fraternus Say, 1824
- Stigmus fulvicornis Rohwer, 1923
- Stigmus fulvipes W. Fox, 1892
- Stigmus hubbardi Rohwer, 1911
- Stigmus inordinatus W. Fox, 1892
- Stigmus japonicus Tsuneki, 1954
- Stigmus kansitakuanus Tsuneki, 1971
- Stigmus marginicollis (Cameron, 1908)
- Stigmus montivagus Cameron, 1891
- Stigmus munakatai Tsuneki, 1954
- Stigmus murotai Tsuneki, 1977
- Stigmus nigricoxis Strand, 1911
- Stigmus nullirugatus Li & Ma, 2026
- Stigmus parallelus Say, 1837
- Stigmus pendulus Panzer, 1804
- Stigmus podagricus Kohl, 1890
- Stigmus quadriceps Tsuneki, 1954
- Stigmus rugibrevis Li & Ma, 2026
- Stigmus rugilongus Li & Ma, 2026
- Stigmus rumipambensis Benoist, 1942
- Stigmus shirozui Tsuneki, 1964
- Stigmus solskyi A. Morawitz, 1864
- Stigmus sulcipervius Li & Ma, 2026
- Stigmus temporalis Kohl, 1892
- Stigmus tibisulcatusLi & Ma, 2026
