= Pulverro =

Scientific classification
- Domain: Eukaryota
- Kingdom: Animalia
- Phylum: Arthropoda
- Class: Insecta
- Order: Hymenoptera
- Infraorder: Aculeata
- Superfamily: Apoidea
- Family: Ammoplanidae
- Genus: Pulverro; Pate, 1937

Genus of wasps

Pulverro is a genus of aphid wasps in the family Ammoplanidae. There are about 13 described species in Pulverro.

== Species ==
These 13 species belong to the genus Pulverro:

- Pulverro boharti N. Smith, 1983
- Pulverro californicus Eighme, 1973
- Pulverro chumashano Pate, 1937
- Pulverro coconino N. Smith, 1983
- Pulverro columbianus (Kohl, 1890)
- Pulverro constrictus (Provancher, 1895)
- Pulverro costano Pate, 1937
- Pulverro eighmei N. Smith, 1983
- Pulverro laevis (Provancher, 1895)
- Pulverro mescalero Pate, 1937
- Pulverro mexicanus N. Smith, 1983
- Pulverro monticola Eighme, 1969
- Pulverro patei N. Smith, 1983
