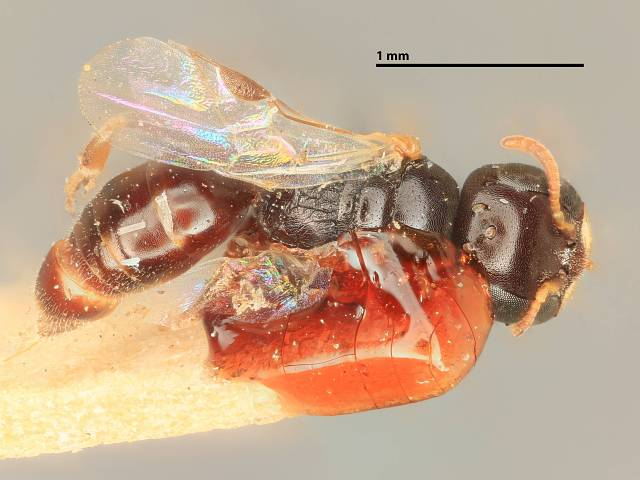
- Ammoplanops cockerelli

Scientific classification
- Kingdom: Animalia
- Phylum: Arthropoda
- Class: Insecta
- Order: Hymenoptera
- Infraorder: Aculeata
- Superfamily: Apoidea
- Family: Ammoplanidae
- Genus: Ammoplanops; Gussakovskij, 1931

= Ammoplanops =

Genus of wasps

Ammoplanops is a genus of aphid wasps in the family Ammoplanidae. There are about 15 species described in the genus Ammoplanops.

== Species ==
These 15 species belong to the genus Ammoplanops:

- Ammoplanops ashmeadi Pate, 1939
- Ammoplanops californicus R. Bohart & Smith, 1978
- Ammoplanops carinatus Gussakovskij, 1931
- Ammoplanops cockerelli (Ashmead, 1903)
- Ammoplanops cressoni Pate, 1939
- Ammoplanops irwini R. Bohart & Smith, 1978
- Ammoplanops milleri R. Bohart & Smith, 1978
- Ammoplanops moenkopi Pate, 1939
- Ammoplanops mongolicus Tsuneki, 1972
- Ammoplanops neomexicanus R. Bohart & Smith, 1978
- Ammoplanops powelli R. Bohart & Smith, 1978
- Ammoplanops timberlakei Pate, 1939
- Ammoplanops tuberculifer Gussakovskij, 1931
- Ammoplanops utahensis R. Bohart & Smith, 1978
- Ammoplanops vierecki Pate, 1939
