= Parammoplanus =

Scientific classification
- Domain: Eukaryota
- Kingdom: Animalia
- Phylum: Arthropoda
- Class: Insecta
- Order: Hymenoptera
- Infraorder: Aculeata
- Superfamily: Apoidea
- Family: Ammoplanidae
- Genus: Parammoplanus; Pate, 1939

Genus of wasps

Parammoplanus is a genus of aphid wasps in the family Ammoplanidae. There are about 19 described species in Parammoplanus.

== Species ==
These 19 species belong to the genus Parammoplanus:

- Parammoplanus apache (Pate, 1937)
- Parammoplanus brooksi N. Smith, 2010
- Parammoplanus cavifrons N. Smith, 2010
- Parammoplanus flavidus N. Smith, 2010
- Parammoplanus foveatus N. Smith, 2010
- Parammoplanus griswoldi N. Smith, 2010
- Parammoplanus heydoni N. Smith, 2010
- Parammoplanus hiatus N. Smith, 2010
- Parammoplanus irwini N. Smith, 2010
- Parammoplanus lenape (Pate, 1937)
- Parammoplanus montanus N. Smith, 2010
- Parammoplanus olamentke (Pate, 1943)
- Parammoplanus parkeri N. Smith, 2010
- Parammoplanus succinacius N. Smith, 2010
- Parammoplanus texanus N. Smith, 2010
- Parammoplanus verrucosus N. Smith, 2010
- Parammoplanus woolleyi N. Smith, 2010
- Parammoplanus yanegai N. Smith, 2010
- Parammoplanus zolnerowichi N. Smith, 2010
