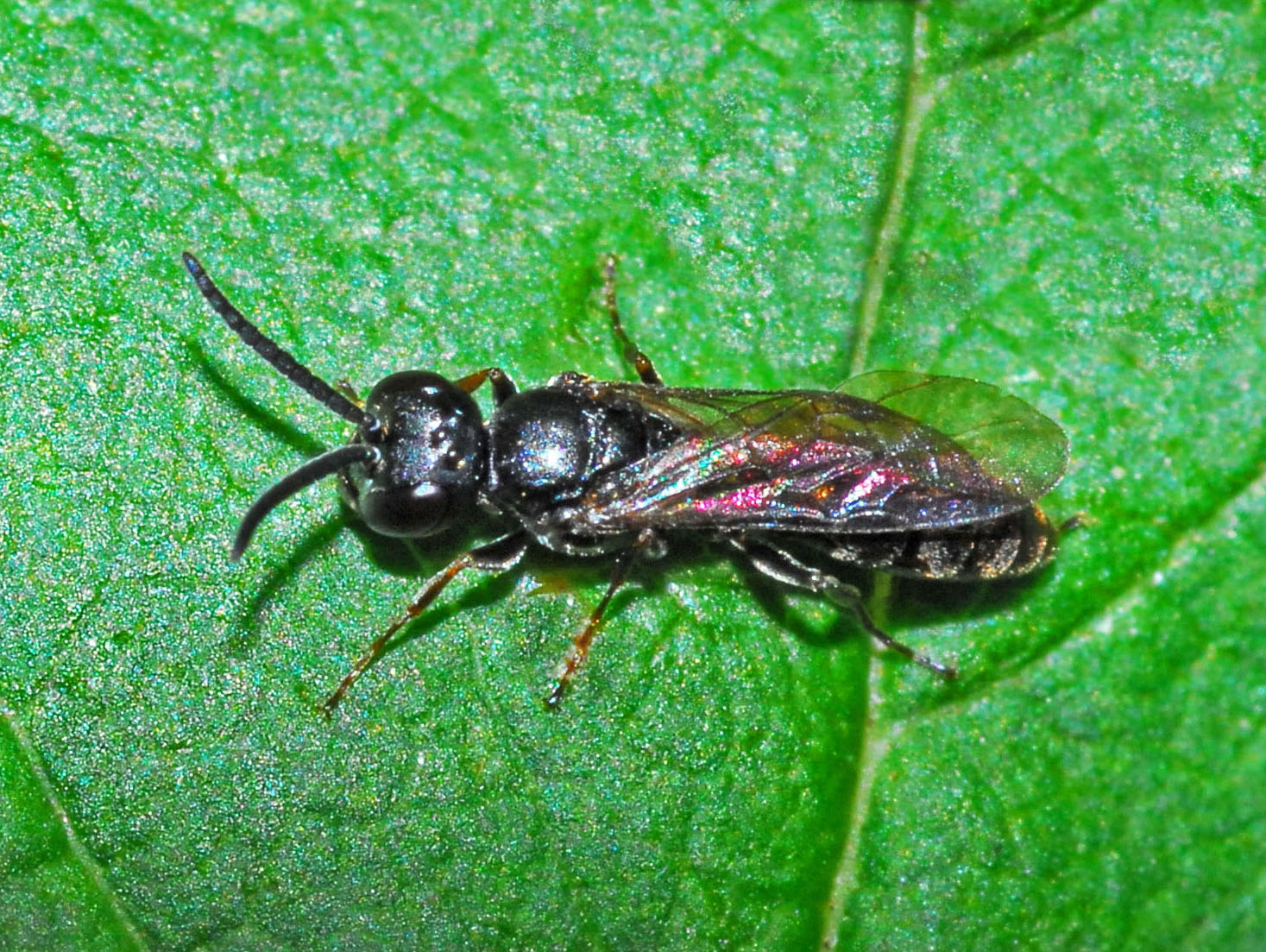
- Passaloecus species

Scientific classification
- Kingdom: Animalia
- Phylum: Arthropoda
- Class: Insecta
- Order: Hymenoptera
- Family: Pemphredonidae
- Tribe: Pemphredonini
- Subtribe: Pemphredonina
- Genus: Passaloecus; Shuckard, 1837

= Passaloecus =

Genus of wasps

Passaloecus is a genus of wasps in the family Pemphredonidae. The 40 species are found in the Nearctic. They are especially represented in the Palearctic.

== Species ==
These 48 species belong to the genus Passaloecus:

- Passaloecus annulatus (Say, 1837)^{i c g}
- Passaloecus areolatus Vincent, 1979^{i c g}
- Passaloecus armeniacae Cockerell in Cockerell and Fox, 1897^{i c g}
- Passaloecus australis Merisuo, 1976^{i c g}
- Passaloecus borealis Dahlbom, 1844^{i c g}
- Passaloecus brevilabris Wolf, 1958^{i c g}
- Passaloecus clypealis Faester, 1947^{i c g}
- Passaloecus columnaris Ma and Q. Li, 2012^{i c g}
- Passaloecus corniger Shuckard, 1837^{i c g}
- Passaloecus cuspidatus F. Smith, 1856^{i c g b}
- Passaloecus cuspidifrons Merisuo, 1976^{i c g}
- Passaloecus dorsalis Kohl, 1912^{c}
- Passaloecus dubius Tsuneki, 1955^{i c g}
- Passaloecus electrobius Budrys, 1993^{g}
- Passaloecus eremita Kohl, 1893^{i c g}
- Passaloecus erugatus Vincent, 1979^{i c g}
- Passaloecus fasciatus Rohwer^{g}
- Passaloecus gallicola Vincent, 1979^{i c g}
- Passaloecus gracilis (Curtis, 1834)^{i c g}
- Passaloecus hinganicus Merisuo, 1976^{i c g}
- Passaloecus insignis (Vander Linden, 1829)^{i c g}
- Passaloecus koreanus Tsuneki, 1974^{i c g}
- Passaloecus labrinigratus Ma and Q. Li, 2012^{i c g}
- Passaloecus lineatus Vincent, 1979^{i c g}
- Passaloecus longiceps Merisuo, 1973^{i c g}
- Passaloecus melanocrus Rohwer, 1911^{i c g}
- Passaloecus melanognanthus Rohwer, 1910^{c g}
- Passaloecus melanognathus Rohwer, 1910^{i g}
- Passaloecus microceras Sorg, 1986^{g}
- Passaloecus miltoloma Vincent, 1979^{i c g}
- Passaloecus mishimaensis Tsuneki, 1990^{i c g}
- Passaloecus mongolicus Tsuneki, 1972^{i c g}
- Passaloecus monilicornis Dahlbom, 1842^{i c g}
- Passaloecus multituberculatus Ma and Q. Li, 2012^{i c g}
- Passaloecus munax Sorg, 1986^{g}
- Passaloecus nipponicola Tsuneki, 1955^{i c g}
- Passaloecus patagiatus Vincent, 1979^{i c g}
- Passaloecus petiolatus Ma and Q. Li, 2012^{i c g}
- Passaloecus pictus Ribaut, 1952^{i c g}
- Passaloecus piletskisi Budrys, 1993^{g}
- Passaloecus relativus W. Fox, 1892^{i c g}
- Passaloecus ribauti Merisuo, 1974^{i c g}
- Passaloecus scudderi Cockerell, 1906^{g}
- Passaloecus singularis Dahlbom, 1844^{i c g}
- Passaloecus turanicus Gussakovskij, 1952^{i c g}
- Passaloecus turionum Dahlbom, 1844^{i c g}
- Passaloecus vandeli Ribaut, 1952^{i c g}
- Passaloecus vigilans Merisuo, 1976^{i c g}
- Passaloecus zherichini Budrys, 1993^{g}

Data sources: i = ITIS, c = Catalogue of Life, g = GBIF, b = Bugguide.net
