= Ammoplanus =

Scientific classification
- Kingdom: Animalia
- Phylum: Arthropoda
- Class: Insecta
- Order: Hymenoptera
- Infraorder: Aculeata
- Superfamily: Apoidea
- Family: Ammoplanidae
- Genus: Ammoplanus; Giraud, 1869

Synonyms
- Hoplocrabron De Stefani Perez, 1887; Ceballosia Giner Marí, 1943

Genus of wasps

Ammoplanus is a genus of aphid wasps in the family Ammoplanidae. There are more than 50 described species in Ammoplanus.

== Species ==
These 51 species belong to the genus Ammoplanus:

- Ammoplanus alpinensis N. Smith, 2009
- Ammoplanus angularis Gussakovskij, 1952
- Ammoplanus atacamensis Sielfeld, 1980
- Ammoplanus atlasensis Boucek, 2001
- Ammoplanus bifidus N. Smith, 2009
- Ammoplanus bischoffi Maréchal, 1938
- Ammoplanus biscopula Boucek, 2001
- Ammoplanus biskrensis Boucek, 2001
- Ammoplanus blascoi Boucek & Gayubo, 2001
- Ammoplanus ceballosi Giner Marí, 1943
- Ammoplanus chemehuevi Pate, 1943
- Ammoplanus clemente Menke, 1997
- Ammoplanus curvidens Tsuneki, 1972
- Ammoplanus denesi Boucek, 2001
- Ammoplanus diversipes Gussakovskij, 1931
- Ammoplanus dusmeti Giner Marí, 1943
- Ammoplanus freidbergi Boucek, 2001
- Ammoplanus friedbergi Boucek, 2001
- Ammoplanus gegen Tsuneki, 1972
- Ammoplanus gengen Tsuneki, 1972
- Ammoplanus gilberti N. Smith, 2009
- Ammoplanus hofferi Snoflak, 1943
- Ammoplanus insularis Giner Marí, 1943
- Ammoplanus kaplanae Boucek, 2001
- Ammoplanus kaszabi Tsuneki, 1972
- Ammoplanus kazenasi Boucek, 2001
- Ammoplanus kohlii Kohl, 1898
- Ammoplanus kondarensis Marshakov, 1976
- Ammoplanus loti Pate, 1943
- Ammoplanus mandibularis Cameron, 1903
- Ammoplanus marathroicus (De Stefani Perez, 1887)
- Ammoplanus minutus Boucek, 2001
- Ammoplanus molliekayae N. Smith, 2009
- Ammoplanus monticola Gussakovskij, 1952
- Ammoplanus nasutus Tsuneki, 1972
- Ammoplanus pallidus N. Smith, 2009
- Ammoplanus perrisi Giraud, 1869
- Ammoplanus platytarsus Gussakovskij, 1931
- Ammoplanus pragensis Snoflak, 1945
- Ammoplanus quabajai Pate, 1943
- Ammoplanus rhinoceros N. Smith, 2009
- Ammoplanus rjabovi Gussakovskij, 1931
- Ammoplanus serratus Tsuneki, 1972
- Ammoplanus strumae Boucek, 2001
- Ammoplanus sulcifrons N. Smith, 2009
- Ammoplanus surrufus N. Smith, 2009
- Ammoplanus tetli Pate, 1943
- Ammoplanus torresi Gayubo, 1991
- Ammoplanus transcaspicus Gussakovskij, 1931
- Ammoplanus unami Pate, 1937
- Ammoplanus vanyumi Pate, 1943
