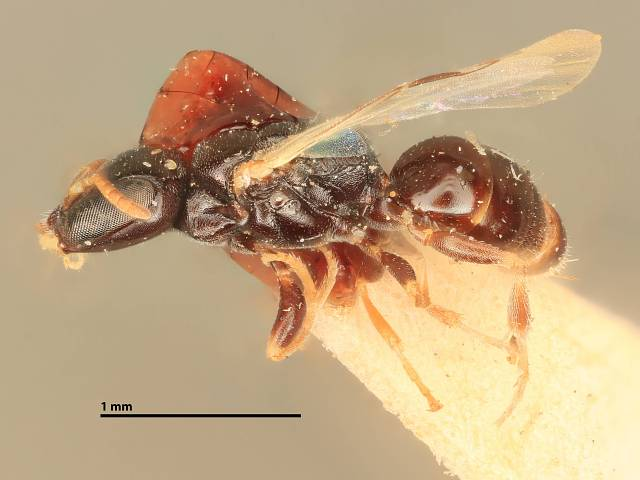
- Ammoplanops cockerelli

Scientific classification
- Kingdom: Animalia
- Phylum: Arthropoda
- Class: Insecta
- Order: Hymenoptera
- Superfamily: Apoidea
- Family: Ammoplanidae; Evans, 1959

Genera
- see text

= Ammoplanidae =

Family of wasps

Ammoplanidae is a family of aphid wasps formerly treated as the Crabronidae subtribe Ammoplanina. There are about 10 genera and at least 130 described species in Ammoplanina. Phylogenetic analyses in 2018 and 2021 have confirmed this group as the sister lineage to the bees, and thus accorded the group family rank.

== Genera ==
These 10 genera belong to Ammoplanidae:

- Ammoplanellus Gussakovskij, 1931
- Ammoplanops Gussakovskij, 1931
- Ammoplanus Giraud, 1869
- Ammostigmus Antropov, 2010
- Mohavena Pate, 1939
- Parammoplanus Pate, 1939
- Protostigmus Turner, 1918
- Pulverro Pate, 1937
- Riparena Pate, 1939
- Timberlakena Pate, 1939
