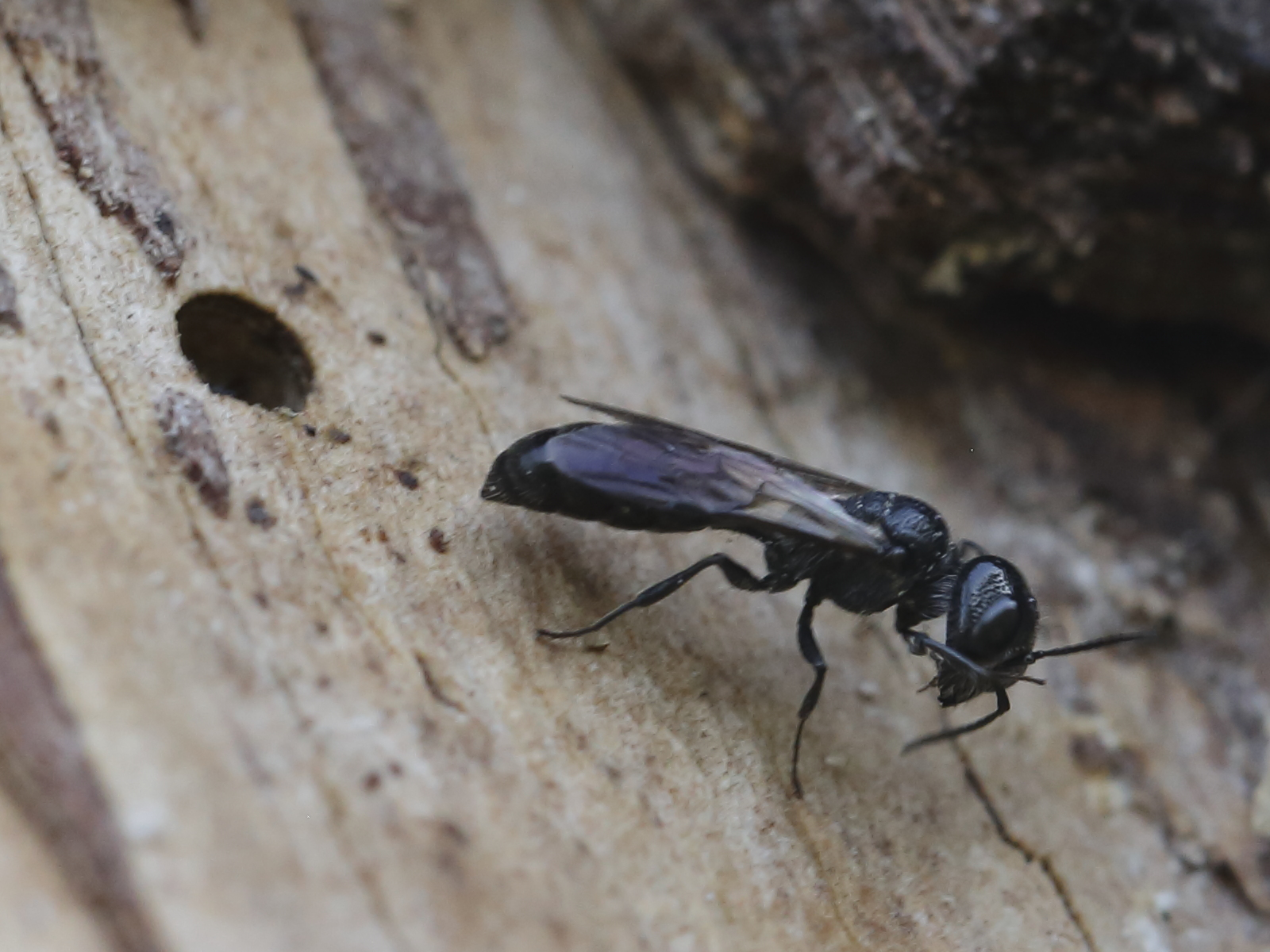

Scientific classification
- Kingdom: Animalia
- Phylum: Arthropoda
- Clade: Pancrustacea
- Class: Insecta
- Order: Hymenoptera
- Superfamily: Apoidea
- Family: Pemphredonidae

Genera
- 19 (see text)

= Pemphredonidae =

Family of wasps

Pemphredonidae is a family of aphid wasps formerly treated as the subfamily Pemphredoninae. There are 19 genera and 556 described species in the family.

== Description and identification ==
The primary morphological distinction between the Pemphredonidae and the Psenidae is that Pemphredonidae never have more than two submarginal cells in their forewing while Psenidae have three submarginal cells.

== Biology ==
The subfamily consists of solitary wasps, each genus having its own distinct and consistent prey preferences. The adult females dig tunnels in the ground, or plant material, for nesting. As with all other apoid wasps, the larvae are carnivorous; females hunt for prey on which to lay their eggs, mass provisioning the nest cells with paralyzed, living prey that the larvae feed upon after hatching from the egg.

== Taxonomy and phylogeny ==
As Pemphredoninae, this taxon was previously divided into four tribes: Entomosericini, Odontosphecini, Psenini, and Pemphredonini. The Pemphredonini were considered to have by far the largest number of species. Phylogenetic analyses to resolve the paraphyly of Crabronidae through erecting additional families also found the Pemphredoninae to be polyphyletic. As a result, more recent classifications treat Psenidae (comprising the former tribes Psenini and Odontosphecini) as a separate family, and sister to the newly-erected family Ammoplanidae. Ammoplanidae is also rendered as the most sister family to the bees (Anthophila). The Pemphredonidae (Pemphredonini excluding Ammoplanina) is instead sister taxon to the Philanthidae. In continued revision, Entomosericini has also been elevated to family status as Entomosericidae.

== Genera ==
The Pemphredonidae are restricted to the former subtribes Pemphredonina, Spilomenina, and Stigmina, which now are treated as subfamilies.

Pemphredoninae Dahlbom, 1835

- Diodontus Curtis, 1834
- Passaloecus Shuckard, 1837
- Pemphredon Latreille, 1796
- Polemistus de Saussure, 1892

Spilomeninae Menke, 1989

- Arpactophilus Smith, 1863
- Microstigmus Ducke, 1907
- Spilomena Shuckard, 1838
- Xysma Pate, 1937

Stigminae R. Bohart & Menke, 1976

- Allostigmus Melo & Naumann, 1999
- Araucastigmus Finnamore, 1995
- Aykhustigmus Finnamore, 1995
- Carinostigmus Tsuneki, 1954
- Ceratostigmus Melo & Naumann, 1999
- Incastigmus Finnamore, 1995
- Llaqhastigmus Finnamore, 1995
- Paracrabro Turner, 1907
- Parastigmus Antropov, 1992
- Stigmus Panzer, 1802
- Tzustigmus Finnamore, 1995

=== Transferred to Ammoplaninidae ===
Ten genera of Ammoplanina now comprise the family Ammoplaninidae. This transfer includes 137 species.

- Ammoplanellus Gussakovskij, 1931
- Ammoplanops Gussakovskij, 1931
- Ammoplanus Giraud, 1869
- Ammostigmus Antropov, 2010
- Mohavena Pate, 1939
- Parammoplanus Pate, 1939
- Protostigmus Turner, 1918
- Pulverro Pate, 1937
- Riparena Pate, 1939
- Timberlakena Pate, 1939

=== Transferred to Entomosericidae ===
A single genus of Entomosericini now comprises the Entomosericidae. This transfer includes 3 species.

- Entomosericus Dahlbom, 1845

=== Transferred to Psenidae ===
One genus of Odontosphecini (Odontosphex) and 11 genera of Psenini now comprise the family Psenidae. This transfer includes 485 species.

- Ammopsen Krombein, 1959
- Deinomimesa Perkins, 1899
- Lithium Finnamore, 1987
- Mimesa Shuckard, 1937
- Mimumesa Malloch, 1933
- Nesomimesa Malloch, 1933
- Odontopsen Tsuneki, 1964
- Odontosphex Arnold, 1951
- Pluto Pate, 1937
- Psen Latreille, 1796
- Pseneo Malloch, 1933
- Psenulus Kohl, 1897

=== Transferred to Angarosphecidae ===
Two fossil wasp genera from the Weald Clay were originally considered to possibly be in the Pemphredoninae. They are currently classified among the 15 genera of the extinct family, Angarosphecidae.

- †Archisphex Evans, 1969
- †Angarosphex Rasnitsyn, 1975
