= Tiphia davidrajui =

Scientific classification
- Domain: Eukaryota
- Kingdom: Animalia
- Phylum: Arthropoda
- Class: Insecta
- Order: Hymenoptera
- Family: Tiphiidae
- Genus: Tiphia
- Species: T. davidrajui

Binomial name
- Tiphia davidrajui Hanima & Girish Kumar, 2022

Species of wasp

Tiphia davidrajui is a species of wasp belonging to the family Tiphiidae, subfamily Tiphiinae. The species is named after a naturalist from Kerala Mr. David V. Raju.

== Distribution and habitat ==
It is observed in Kerala, Tamil Nadu and West Bengal.

== Description ==
Color is generally black with yellowish brown in antennae, inner side of fore and mid tibia and tarsi, and middle part of mandible and preapical denticle. This was grows up to 9.3–11.2 mm. Mandible doesn't have a preapical denticle and clypeus has median extension emarginated. Basal part of clypeus coarsely punctate and apical part is smooth. Dorsal side of pronotum doesn't have transverse carina. Lateral side of pronotum is smooth and has distinct transdiscal groove. The fore wing is brownish infumate with second cubital vein sinuous.
