= Tiphia bijui =

Scientific classification
- Kingdom: Animalia
- Phylum: Arthropoda
- Clade: Pancrustacea
- Class: Insecta
- Order: Hymenoptera
- Family: Tiphiidae
- Genus: Tiphia
- Species: T. bijui

Binomial name
- Tiphia bijui Hanima & Girish Kumar, 2022

Species of wasp

Tiphia bijui is a species of wasp belonging to the family Tiphiidae, subfamily Tiphiinae. The species is named after an expert field assistant Mr. T. Biju, a Forest watcher at Aralam Wildlife Sanctuary.

== Distribution and habitat ==
It is observed in Goa, Karnataka, Kerala, Tamil Nadu, Uttarakhand, West Bengal.

== Description ==
Color is generally black with lower part and outer margin of tegula yellowish brown and mandible dark brown.
