= Tiphia chareshi =

Scientific classification
- Kingdom: Animalia
- Phylum: Arthropoda
- Class: Insecta
- Order: Hymenoptera
- Family: Tiphiidae
- Genus: Tiphia
- Species: T. chareshi

Binomial name
- Tiphia chareshi Hanima & Girish Kumar, 2022

Species of wasp

Tiphia chareshi is a species of wasp belonging to the family Tiphiidae, subfamily Tiphiinae. The species is named after Mr. C. Charesh.

== Distribution and habitat ==
It is observed in Tamil Nadu.

== Description ==
Grows up to 5.9 mm. Median extension of clypeus is deeply emarginated. Mandible is without preapical denticle. Lateral side of pronotum has crenulated transdiscal groove. Marginal cell of fore wing equals second cubital cell in apical extension. Color is generally black with antennae beneath reddish brown, inner side of fore tibia and fore and mid tarsi yellowish orange; middle part of mandible and its extreme apex reddish brown; and fore wing hyaline.
