= Flower wasp =

Flower wasp can refer to:

- Tiphiidae, the tiphiid wasps or tiphiid flower wasps
- Thynnidae, the thynnid wasps or thynnid flower wasps
- Scoliidae, the scoliid wasps or scoliid flower wasps
- Mutillidae, the velvet ants
