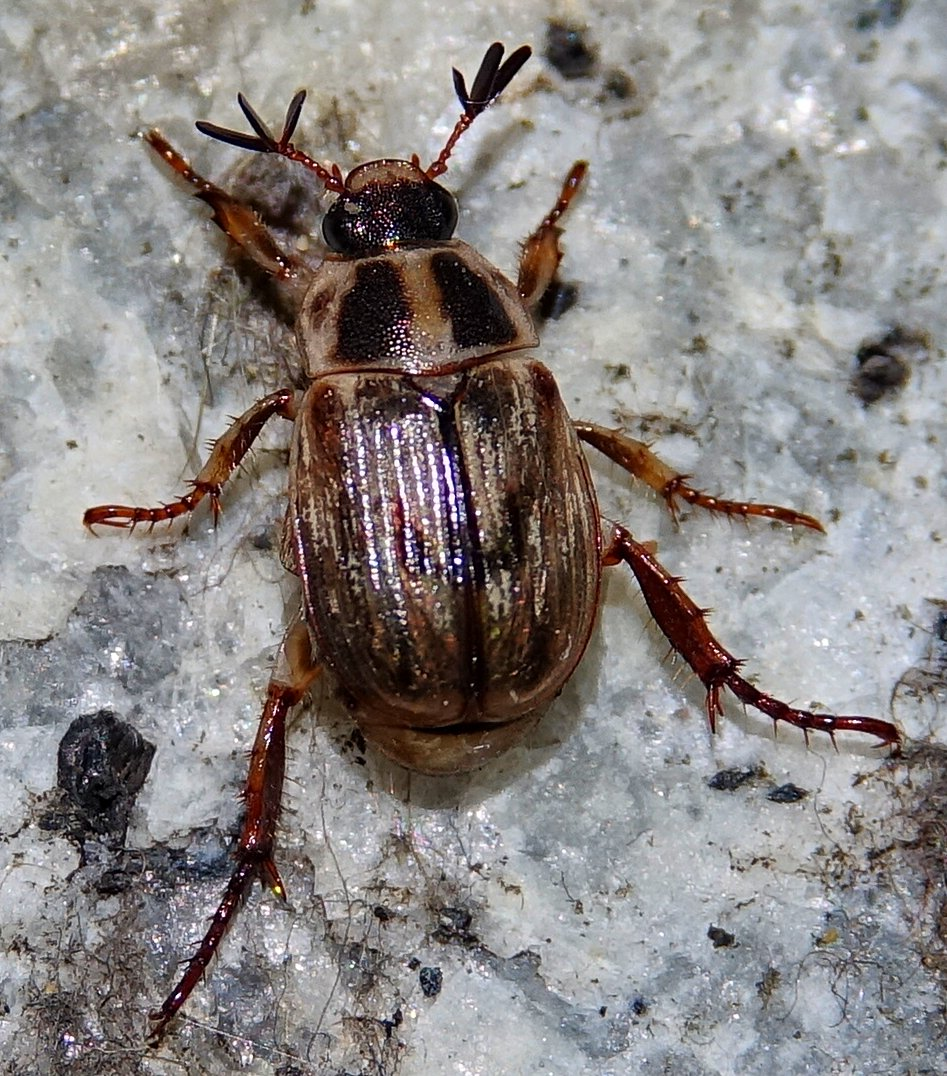

Scientific classification
- Kingdom: Animalia
- Phylum: Arthropoda
- Clade: Pancrustacea
- Class: Insecta
- Order: Coleoptera
- Suborder: Polyphaga
- Infraorder: Scarabaeiformia
- Family: Scarabaeidae
- Genus: Anomala
- Species: A. orientalis

Binomial name
- Anomala orientalis (Waterhouse, 1875)

Synonyms
- Phyllopertha orientalis Waterhouse, 1875; Anomala orientalis (Waterhouse, 1875); Blitopertha orientalis (Waterhouse, 1875); Exomala orientalis (Waterhouse, 1875)

= Anomala orientalis =

Species of beetle

Anomala orientalis (synonym Exomala orientalis), also known as the oriental beetle (OB), is a species of Rutelinae (shining leaf chafers) in the family Scarabaeidae. It is a beetle about 0.7 - 1.1 cm (0.3 - 0.4 inches) long, with mottled, metallic brown- and black-colored elytra and a similarly colored thorax and head during the adult stage. It is sometimes confused with the larger and more colorful Japanese beetle. During the larval stage, the oriental beetle can be identified by the parallel line raster pattern.

This species is native to Asia where it was first found in Japan in 1875. Over time, A. orientalis was spread to other parts of Asia, including Korea, and has since spread to the United States. It was first found in Hawaii and further spread to Northeast states (such as Connecticut, Maine, and New York) as well as some southern states (North Carolina).

Oriental beetles are notorious for their role as pests on plants ranging from sugarcane and other crops (such as maize and pineapple). As larvae, these beetles burrow into the ground as they move throughout fields and chew through plant roots. Their infestation proves to be a current problem that pesticides are aiming to target.

Notably, these beetles have a short mating season that consists of 2 months (mid-June to mid-August) and normally reside beneath the soil burrowed deeply. During mating season, the female will exit the ground and begin emitting a sex pheromone that lures males to her. The molecule serves as a tool for males to locate the female. After copulation, the female returns back into the ground to deposit her eggs. This is where the larvae will mature and begin feeding on plant roots (its pest behavior).

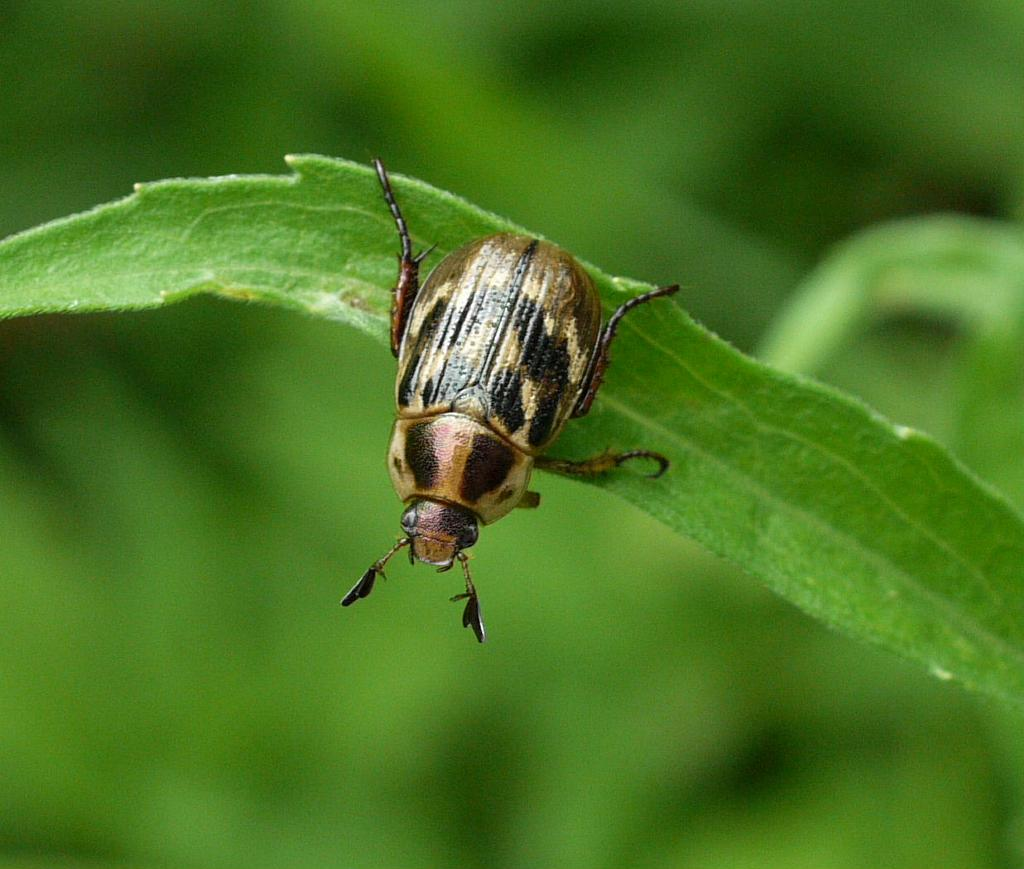
Adult beetle on a leaf

== Nomenclature ==
Throughout its existence, the beetle has undergone multiple scientific name changes. It was first given the name Phyllopertha orientalis in 1875, subsequently placed in the genera Anomala, Blitopertha and Exomala. As of 2003 it is placed within Anomala. "B. orientalis" can still be found in Japanese and Korean literature (although Korean literature also mentions the name "E. orientalis").

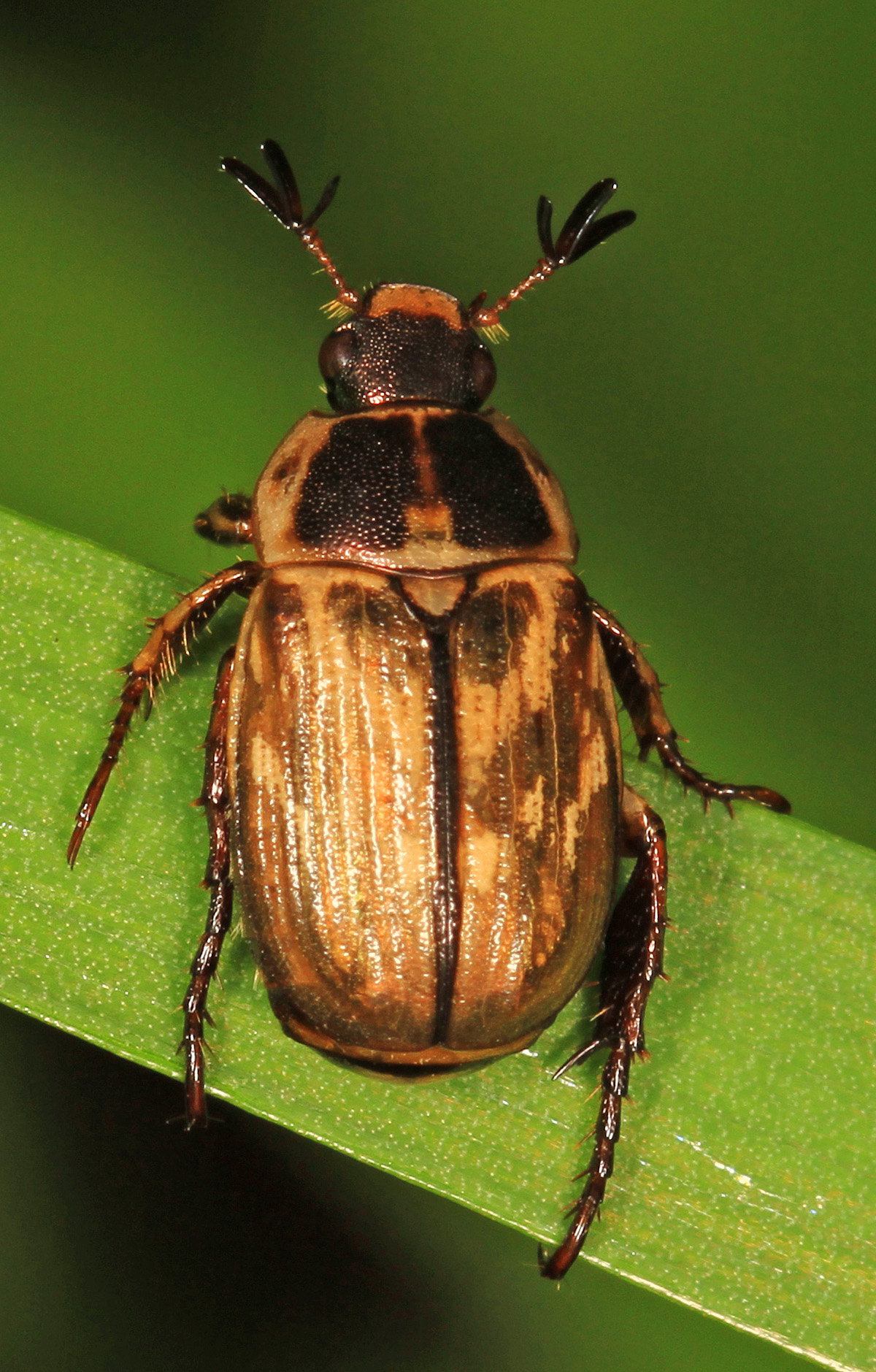
Close-up image of adult

== Geographic range ==
A. orientalis is native to Japan, and was then introduced into the Hawaiian Islands of Oahu approximately in 1908. On these islands, the beetle is known as a garden pest, specifically feeding on sugar cane (Saccharum officinarum). Eventually, the beetle was also found on the mainland of the United States; it was first found in New Haven, Connecticut. As of 2019, it has since been found in 12 states mainly in (New York) but also in (North Carolina). The beetle has spread throughout North America but continues to have most of its population centralized in East Asia including Japan, Korea, Taiwan, and the Philippines.

== Habitat and migration issues ==
A. orientalis typically resides within the soil buried underneath the ground. Males are typically found along the ground on bushes, shrubs, and other low-laying plants. Females, on the other hand, are often found on flowers including roses, chrysanthemums, hollyhocks, phlox, dahlias, and Japanese iris. By feeding on these flowers, the flowers provide an additional source of nutrients which help the female oviposit an additional 5.46 ± 0.96 fertile eggs.

During mating seasons, these beetles may be found above the ground to engage in copulation. However, the beetles are observed to quickly reenter the ground once copulation is finished. Female beetles will deposit their eggs underground where the eggs develop and mature. Once the larvae emerge, they have been observed to burrow down in the soil from 8 to 17 inches of depth when the temperature is at 50 °F. The larvae are also known to move horizontally up to 4 feet. The larvae's ability to move such distances gives it the advantage to infect gardens and turfs of large sizes. The larvae continue to move through fields and feed on roots.

The tendency of A. orientalis to reside in the soil restricts their ability to geographically spread over large distances. They do not tend to fly very far even when they are out of the soil. Its ability to migrate from Asia to North America was possible due to contaminated nursery stocks. Infested shipments of rose blossoms or other flowers led to the rise of this beetle in new locations.

== Mating ==
A. orientalis participate in a mating system of prolonged searching polygyny or scramble competition polygyny. The female beetles will emerge from the ground and release a sex pheromone to lure male beetles. After copulating, the female will go back through the soil to oviposit. Because of this pattern, female beetles are above ground for only short periods of time, which makes it difficult for males to find and mate with female beetles.

As the female emerges, she assumes a calling position in which she has her head in the soil with the abdomen pointing up and out of the soil; this is known as the head-stand position. The female A. orientalis will then continue to exhibit leg raising that is proposed to help with sex pheromone dissemination. While she is emitting the sex pheromone, the male beetle will approach the female beetle from behind and copulate with her.

After copulation, the male beetle dismounts from the female while continuing to hold on to her posterior abdomen. The male beetle has been observed to hold onto the female for as long as 2 hours after copulating. The male will let go as the female digs back into the soil to enter at the place she had exited. By continuing to hold on to the female, the male is able to ensure no other males will attempt to copulate with the female before she can oviposit; this helps ensure the male's paternity success. The female is known to oviposit 1 to 11 inches deep in the soil.

=== Male paternity security ===
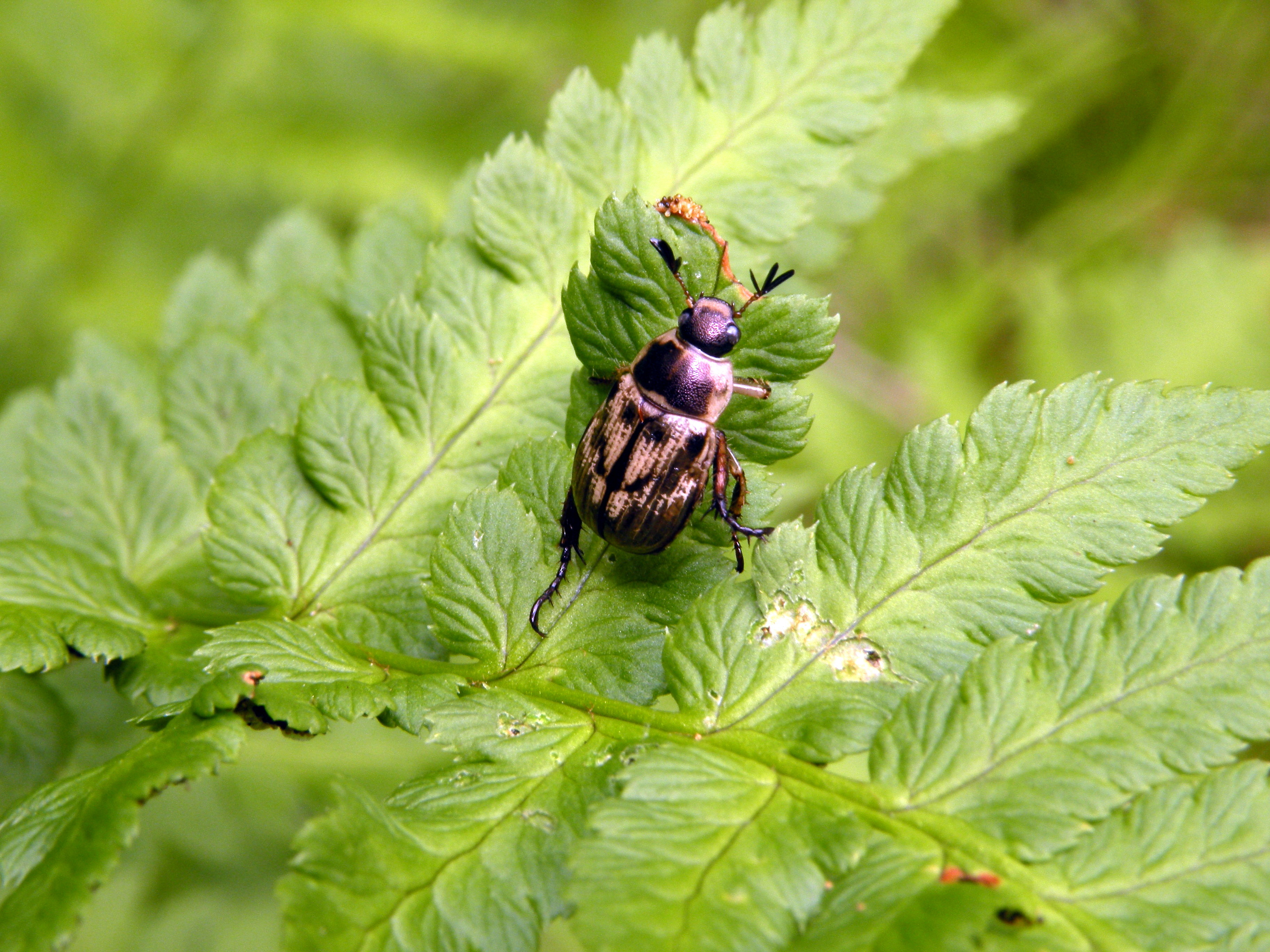
On a leaf

There are two identifiable factors that affect male A. orientalis paternity. The first consists of the male genitalia morphology. It was found that the size of the spicule of the male genitalia directly correlates with fertilization and paternity success. Hypotheses speculate that the larger spicule helps provide more male-female genitalia contact and more effective stimulation, or that the larger spicule helps leverage the genitalia for deeper penetration or effective thrusting. It's important to note that this finding was only found to be true for the first mating. At the second male, the genitalia size had no significant difference for increased or decreased paternity success.

The second factor was the male body size. Smaller male beetles were found to achieve greater relative paternity when they were the first mating male. Hypotheses suggest that these smaller males may have less mating opportunities and interactions which led them to invest all of their resources for that single copulation. Alternatively, larger male beetles may have more opportunities for mating which means they are more likely to spread their resources and sperm across multiple female mating partners, rather than invest all of their resources into a single copulation.

=== Sexual selection ===
The behavior of female A. orientalis leads to intrasexual selection between males by mating with the first male she encounters while receptive. Males that are able to detect and find the female from her released sex pheromones will be at an advantage. Males with superior detection ability are expected to have higher frequency of mating. Additionally, males that are able to use a combination of flying and walking will be able to reach females much more quickly than males that only walk along the ground. Overall, this will select for evolutionarily advantageous traits.

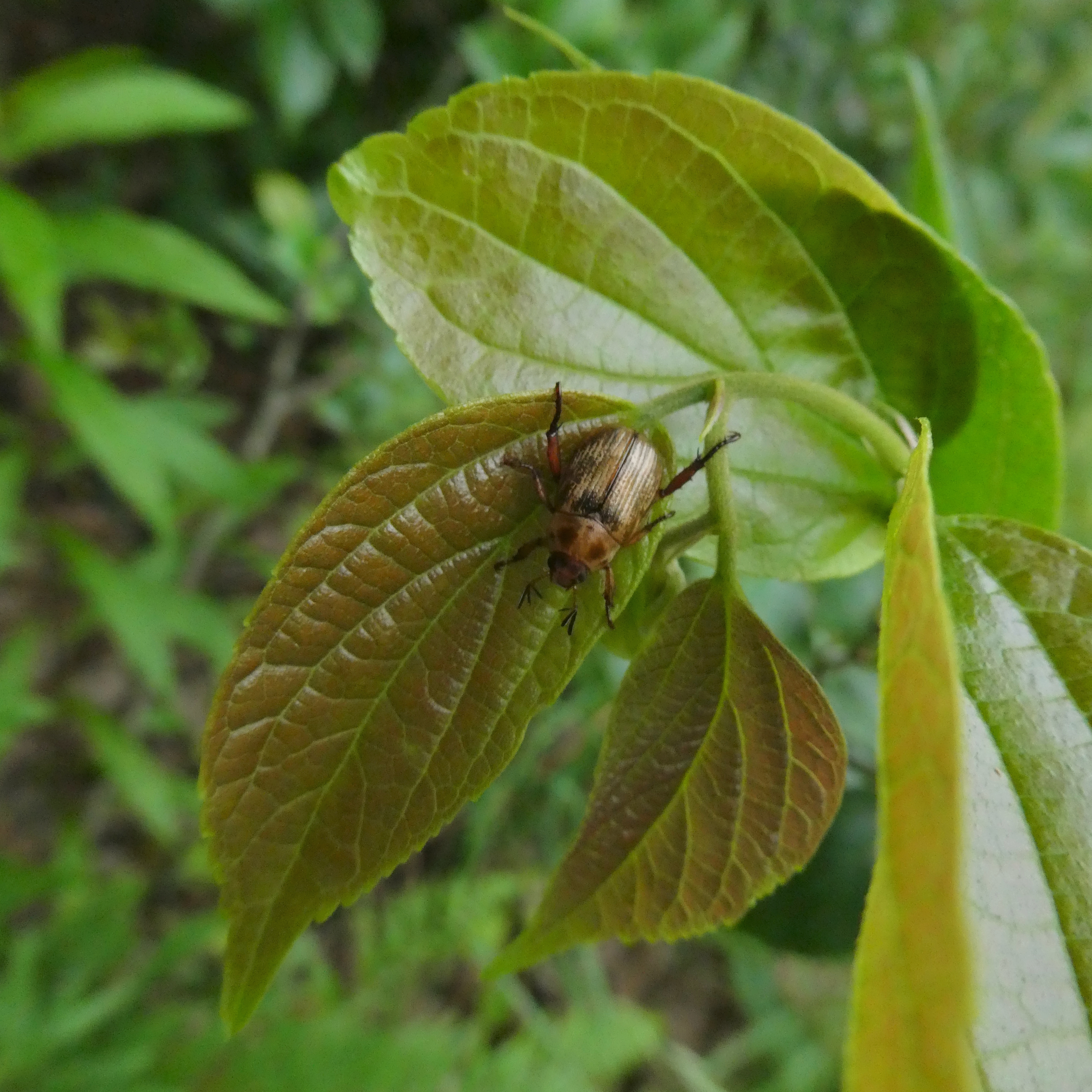
On a leaf

=== Mate searching behavior ===
To begin mating processes, the female A. orientalis beetle will emit sex pheromones to lure the male close to her. Female beetles are not affected or activated in any way due to the sex pheromone, but male beetles are extremely attracted to the sex pheromones and are further activated to begin mating when these sex pheromones reach them.

This pheromone was isolated and identified by Leal et al. (1994). The researchers collected crude extract of female volatiles to obtain pheromonal samples. These samples were further run on gas chromatography experiments and used for other characterization methods as well.

7-(Z)- and 7-(E)-tetradecen-2-one were identified as sex pheromone molecules present in the A. orientalis beetles. These two molecules are known as enantiomers which only differ in the molecular organization but consist of the same atom make-up. It's proposed that the female beetle releases a mix of both of these molecules in a ratio skewed towards the Z-isomer at a 7:1 ratio (Z:E).

When tested, male beetles were equally lured and captured at the same rate if lured by the 7:1 mixed ratio of sex pheromones compared to the pure mixture of only the Z isomer. Therefore, the 7-(Z)-tetradece-2-one molecule can be seen as the most influential and impactful on A. orientalis male beetles.

When males caught evidence of the molecule in the air, the activation response began as restlessness, waving antennae, waving the forelegs, and then jumping up to fly towards the source of the sex pheromone. These males would continue to fly and travel towards the source until reaching it. Upon arrival, the males would immediately attempt to copulate with the source.

This behavior varied depending on the male's age. Males that were younger than 4 days old were unable to fly, although they did exhibit some activation behavior (this is a decreased number compared to beetles past 4 days old). As they aged past the 4-day mark, and continued to increase in age, this was directly proportional to the number of males activated and flying towards the source of the sex pheromone molecule.

To identify the thresholds of molecule required for activation, Leal et al. (1994) found that with 1 mg of 7-tetradece-2-one Z:E mixture (7:1) male beetles had significantly more activation than with 0.1 mg of the mixture. However, when the dosage was increased to 10 mg of the mixture, there was no significant increase or difference in male beetle activation. Zhang et al. (1994) also tested the threshold of male activation by testing pure cultures of the 7-(Z)-tetradece-2-one. When at 10 ng, the male beetle was activated as expected. At 50 ng of the mixture, the male beetle had a similar pattern of activation and had no significant difference again. With these results, it was determined that this is both an upper and lower threshold of male beetle activation dependent on the amount of 7-(Z)-tetradece-2-one present. There is no activation dependency on E-isomer since it was shown to have little impact on the male beetle for mating activation.

== Pest behavior ==
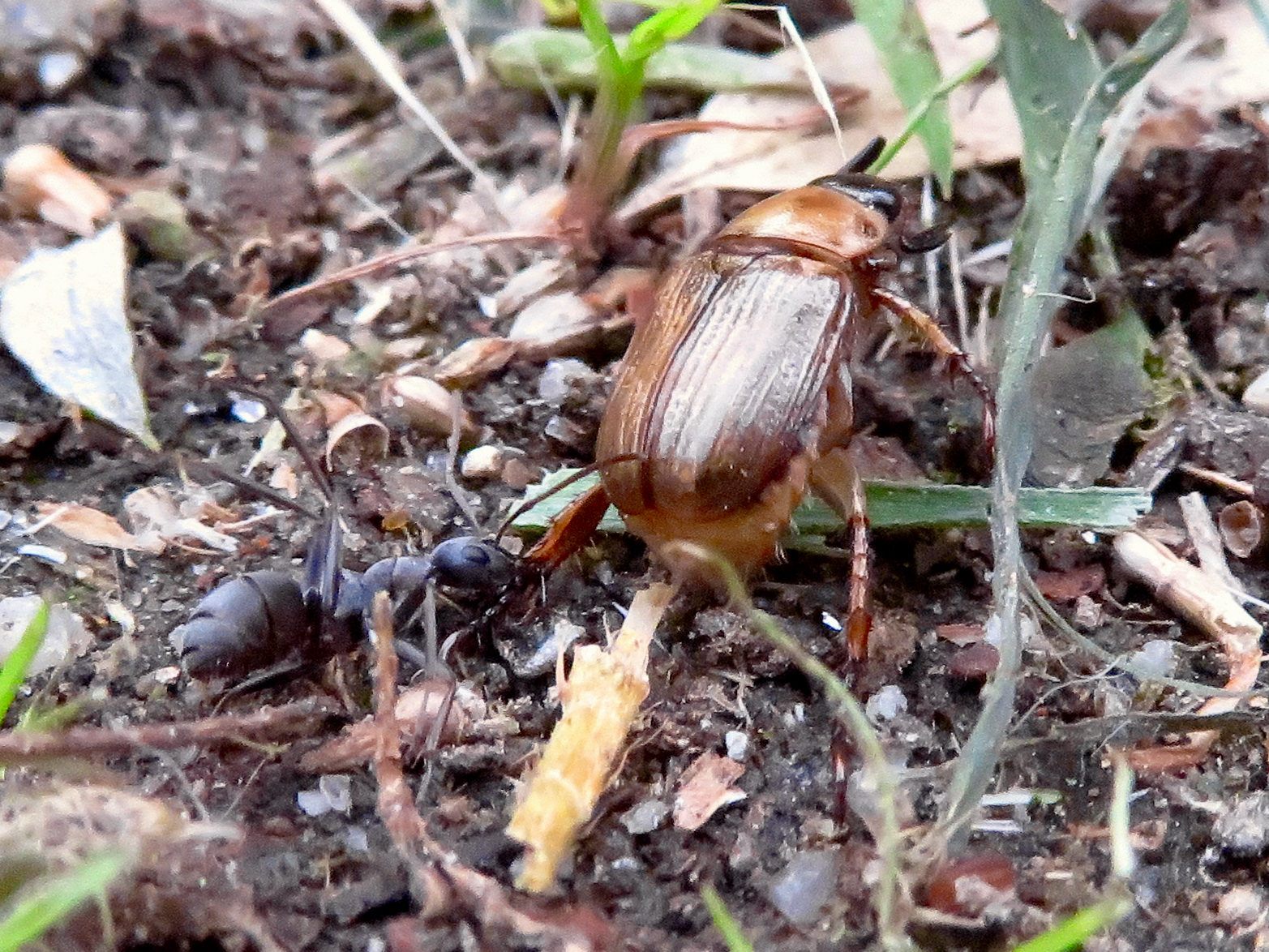
Alongside an ant

Anomala orientalis is a known pest of turf, ornamentals, and several crops which include sugarcane, maize, cranberries, and pineapples. These beetles are known for feeding on plant roots, most commonly during their larval stage.

=== Pest control ===
A. orientalis is considered a pest, and there are methods to control its population. Imidacloprid is the only pesticide against scarabs (A. orientalis is within the Scarabaeidae family) on crops, but it is largely ineffective and expensive.

In order to find a new pesticide for these beetles, it has been suggested to inhibit their mating process. Specifically looking at the sex pheromone pathway, Wenninger (2005) proposed delaying mating processes which both disadvantage the female and male beetle. By blocking the pathway, the male beetle's ability to locate the female beetle becomes more difficult, resulting in delayed mating. On the chance that a male eventually finds the female, it is still proven that as females age, there is a directly proportional relationship to the female's declining fecundity (ability to produce an abundance of offspring). This is a possibility to explore for future pesticide development.

One method is using nematodes, specifically the Korean Entomopathogenic Nematode. In a study investigating multiple nematodes on A. orientalis populations, the Heterorhabditis caused the highest mortality rate in the beetle larvae (96.5%). After that was S. longicaudum Nonsan (58%), S. longi-caudum Gongju (38%), S. carpocapsae Pocheon (33%), and S. glaseri Dongrae (27%). In pupae, the most effective nematode was Steinernema longicaudum Gongju. Heterohabditis and S. glaseri followed in terms of mortality rate among pupae. The nematodes showed equal effectiveness in population control as the insecticide fenitrothion.

In a field experiment on a golf course, the most effective treatment was using a half-rate of Chlorpyrifos-Methyl, an ingredient in insecticide, with a half-rate of Heterohabditis. This resulted in a mortality rate of 90.6% among A. orientalis. Combining nematodes along with insecticides is a potential method of control in the future.

Other methods of control explore the use of bacterium (such as Bacillus thuringiensis serovar japonesis), the "milky disease," or wasps (ie. Scolia manilae Ashmead—which successfully controlled a population in Hawaii). There is also the possibility of using synthetic female sex pheromones to lure and trap the male beetles so that they can slow or stop reproductive rates; this method has already begun to show positive effects in tested environments.

=== Parasites ===
A. orientalis does not currently have any known parasites that are naturally occurring in the environment. However, researchers found that Tiphia vernalis has been found to parasitize on A. orientalis beetles in laboratory settings. Because of its susceptibility, A. orientalis pest populations may be treated with T. vernalis for pest control purposes. Further research is needed to understand this possibility.

== Genetics ==
Scientists identified and cloned a pheromone binding protein in A. orientalis. They were able to study the Japanese and American populations and found that the protein showed similarity of more than 90% to pheromone binding proteins in other scarab beetle species such as P. japonica. In the Japanese populations of A. orientalis, both males and females can detect female-produced pheromones. The protein extracts from antennal and leg tissues of the Japanese beetle population revealed the antenna-specific protein with similarity to the pheromone-binding protein (PBP) in P. japonica. Through cloning and PCR, the protein from A. orientalis showed similarity to pheromone-binding proteins in scarab beetles. This means the antenna-specific protein in A. orientalis is a pheromone-binding protein.
