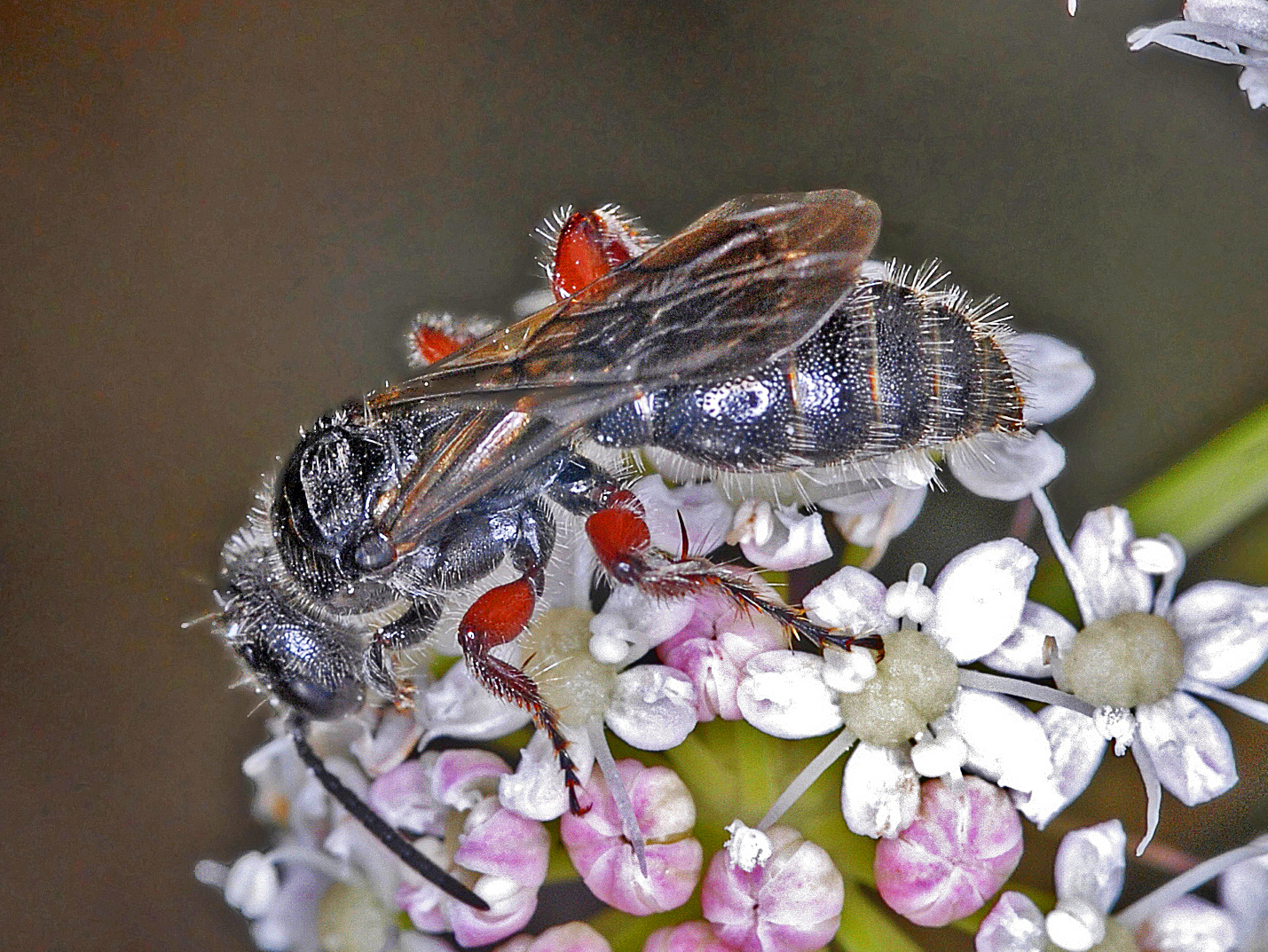

Scientific classification
- Kingdom: Animalia
- Phylum: Arthropoda
- Class: Insecta
- Order: Hymenoptera
- Family: Tiphiidae
- Genus: Tiphia
- Species: T. femorata

Binomial name
- Tiphia femorata Fabricius, 1775

Synonyms
- Tiphia rugosa Tournier, 1889; Bethylus ater Klug, 1810; Bethylus pilipennis Klug, 1808; Sphex nigripes Costa, 1858; Sphex palmipes Schrank, 1781; Sphex rufipes Costa, 1858; Tiphia infima Tournier, 1889; Tiphia lativentris Tournier, 1889; Tiphia tournieri Dalla Torre, 1891

= Tiphia femorata =

Species of wasp

Tiphia femorata, often known as a beetle-killing wasp or common tiphiid wasp, is a species of wasp belonging to the family Tiphiidae, subfamily Tiphiinae.

== Subspecies ==
Subspecies include:

- Tiphia femorata femorata Fabricius, 1775
- Tiphia femorata vaucheri Tournier, 1901 (Belgium, Spain, North Africa)

== Distribution and habitat ==
This species is present in most of Europe, the eastern Palearctic realm, and North Africa. It mainly inhabits warmer, dry and semi-arid grasslands and meadows.

== Description ==
The adult males grow up to 5–12 mm (0.20–0.47 in) long, while females reach 5–15 mm (0.20–0.59 in). The body is completely black, light haired, and the tibiae and femora of the middle and rear pairs of legs are reddish brown. Rather similar species are Tiphia minuta and Tiphia unicolor.

== Biology ==
It is a univoltine species. These wasps can be encountered from June through September feeding on nectar and pollen of flowers (especially on Apiaceae species).

Like most members of Tiphiidae, T. femorata parasitizes by stinging the larvae of various species of Scarabaeidae, and especially hunts beetles of Amphimallon solstitiale. The females can smell larvae of beetles in the soil, then they dig up and drop an egg in their victims. The larvae of T. femorata feed externally on the grubs.

== Gallery ==
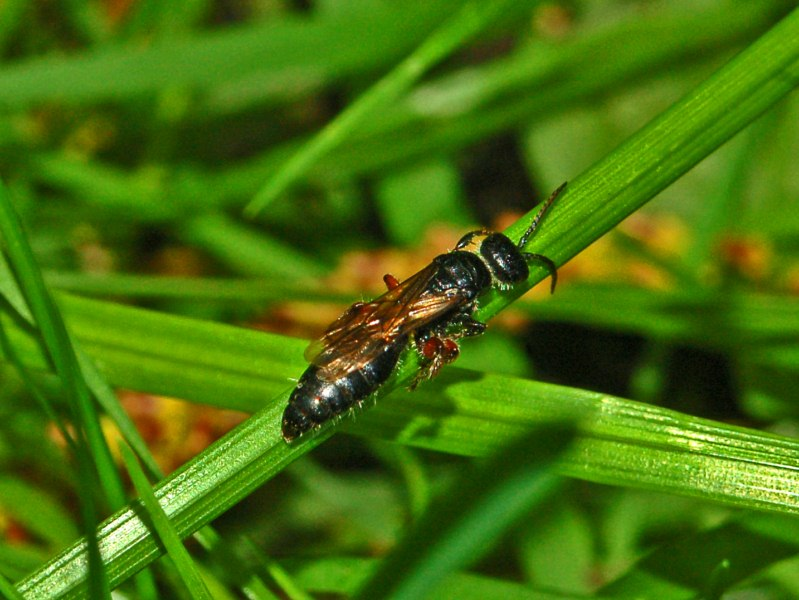
Female

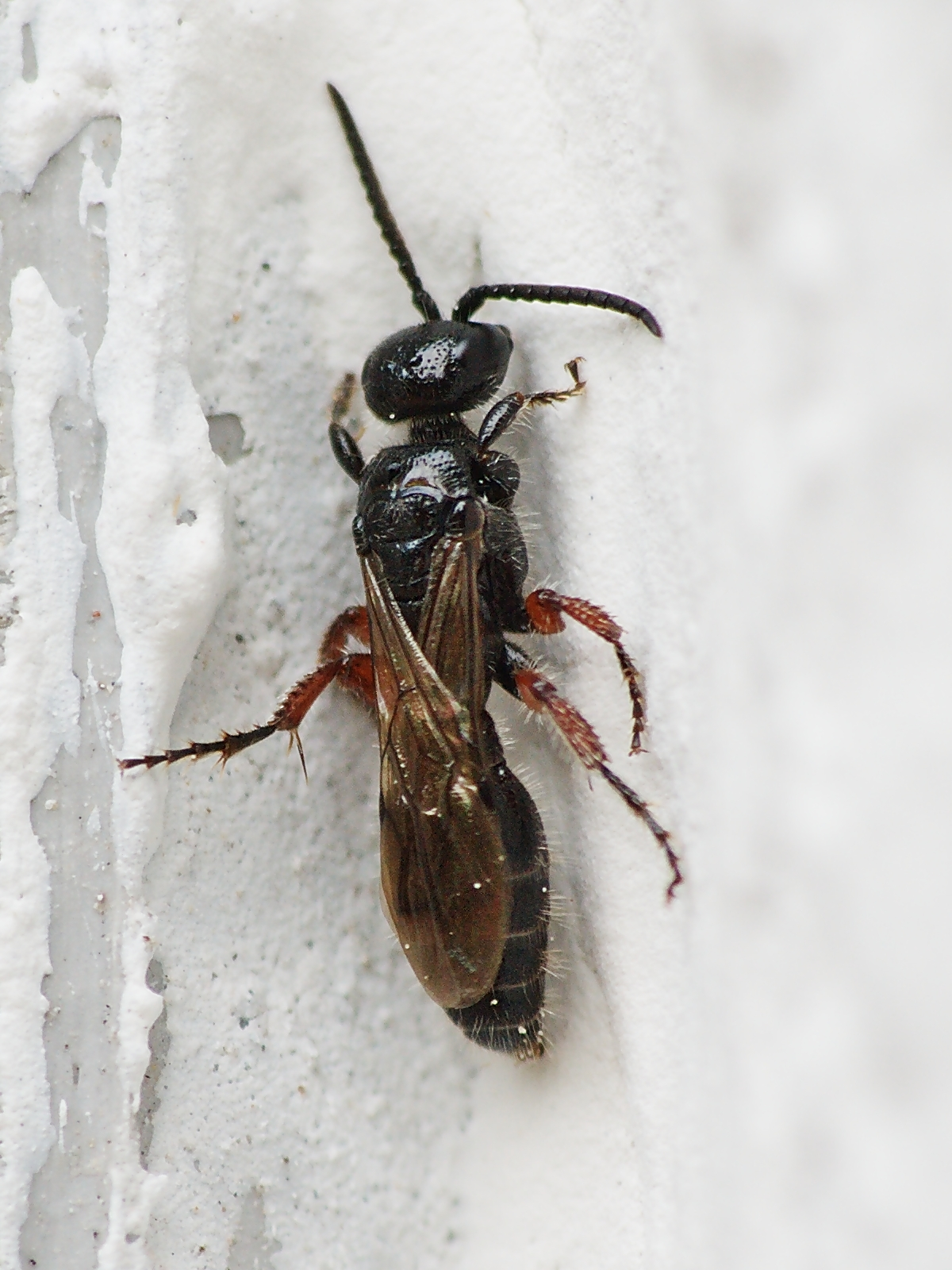

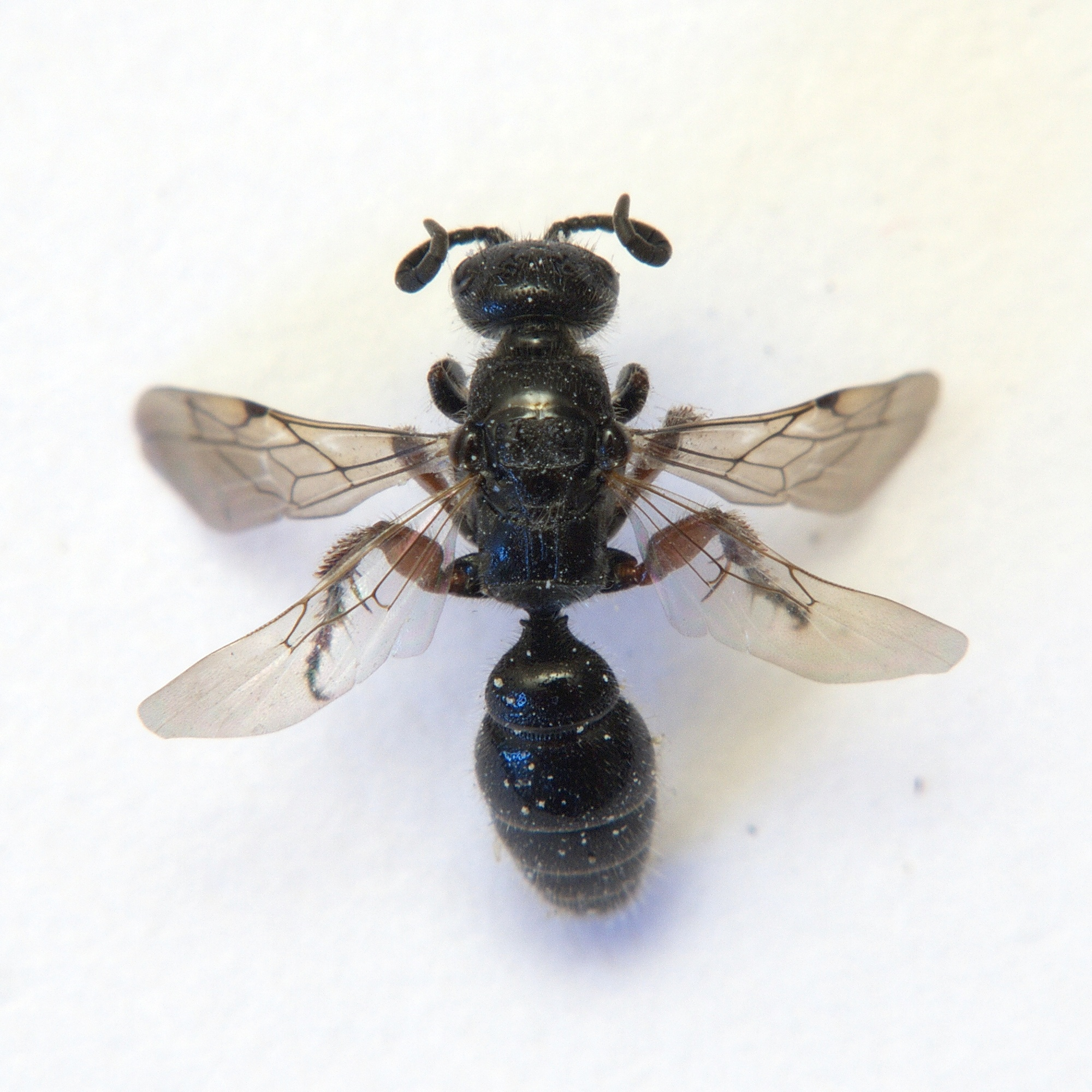
Dead female specimen; wings unfolded, antennae curled

== Bibliography ==
- Allen H. W., Jaynes H. A. (1930). Contribution to the taxonomy of Asiatic wasps of the genus Tiphia (Scoliidae). // Proc. U. S. Nat. Museum, 1930. Vol. 76, N 17. 105 p.
- Tsuneki К. (1985). Taxonomic studies of the Japanese species of the genus Tiphia (I). Revision and addition (Hymenoptera, Tiphiidae). // Spec. Publ. Jap. Hymen. Assoc. 1985. N 31. P. 1-90.
