= Tiphia vernalis =

Scientific classification
- Domain: Eukaryota
- Kingdom: Animalia
- Phylum: Arthropoda
- Class: Insecta
- Order: Hymenoptera
- Family: Tiphiidae
- Genus: Tiphia
- Species: T. vernalis

Binomial name
- Tiphia vernalis Rohwer, 1924

Species of wasp

Tiphia vernalis is a species of wasp in the family Tiphiidae.

In the 1920s and early 1930s, entomologists from the USDA imported Tiphia vernalis from Korea to control Japanese beetle populations.
