= Odorant-binding protein =

Soluble proteins secreted by auxiliary cells surrounding olfactory receptor neurons

Odorant-binding proteins (OBPs) are small (10 to 30 kDa) soluble proteins secreted by auxiliary cells surrounding olfactory receptor neurons, including the nasal mucus of many vertebrate species and in the sensillar lymph of chemosensory sensilla of insects. OBPs are characterized by a specific protein domain that comprises six α-helices joined by three disulfide bonds. Although the function of the OBPs as a whole is not well established, it is believed that they act as odorant transporters, delivering the odorant molecules to olfactory receptors in the cell membrane of sensory neurons.

The olfactory receptors of terrestrial animals exist in an aqueous environment, yet detect odorants that are primarily hydrophobic. The aqueous solubility of hydrophobic odorants is greatly enhanced via odorant-binding proteins, which exist in the extracellular fluid surrounding the odorant receptors. This family is composed of pheromone binding proteins (PBP), which are male-specific and associate with pheromone-sensitive neurons and general-odorant-binding proteins (GOBP). These proteins were initially identified on the basis of their ability to bind with moderate-affinity radioactively labeled odorants.

== Structure ==
OBPs are small proteins on the order of 14 kDa in size. All odorant binding proteins are believed to have a common structure despite their genetic diversity and highly variable primary structures. In vertebrates, OBPs are a part of the lipocalin family. They are structurally characterized by a β-barrel motif composed of antiparallel β-sheets. Insect OBPs share very little amino acid sequence similarity to vertebrate OBPs as they mainly contain α-helical domains. OBPs are divergent across and within species. The percentage of conserved residues between species has been shown to be as low as 8%. OBPs' have a characteristic signature that is recognized by a conserved pattern of six cysteines that are connected in the protein by three disulfide bridges. Their structures have been investigated to explore new bio-inspired repellents against mosquitoes, with potentially improved OBP binding affinity, selectivity, and reduced volatility.

== Function ==
The functions of odorant binding proteins as a whole is not well understood. They are generally believed to increase the solubility of hydrophobic odorants by binding them and transporting them across the aqueous sensillum lymph to receptors in the dendrites, and several studies support a role for OBPs in olfactory perception in vivo. Some odorant binding proteins are hypothesized to hasten odor response termination by extracting odorant molecules from the sensillar lymph or from receptors themselves. Presently, just one OBP, Obp76a, has been thoroughly investigated in the olfactory system of Drosophila and has a known physiological role. Obp76a, better known as LUSH, is located trichoid sensilla and is necessary for normal response of the odor receptor Or67d to its pheromone ligand cis-vaccenyl acetate (cVA), although responses of Or67d to cVA have been detected in the absence of Obp76a LUSH has also been found to bind cVA in vitro and is known to bind other insect pheromones, short-chain alcohols, and phthalates.

In 2016, Larter et al. found that the deletion of the sole abundant OBP, Obp28a, in ab8 sensilla of Drosophila does not reduce the magnitude of their olfactory responses, suggesting that Obp28a is not required for odorant transport and that ab8 sensilla do not require an abundant OBP. Their results further suggest Obp28a may be buffering changes in the odor environment, possibly as molecular gain control, which has not been previously reported for OBPs. OBPs are thought to have multiple roles besides olfaction, including reproduction, egg laying and antiinflammatory responses.

== Expression ==
OBPs are numerous and diverse. In Drosophila, they are encoded by 52 genes of the same family yet only share 20% amino acid similarity between themselves. Some are encoded by the most abundant mRNAs of the antennae. Within and between species, OBPs are expressed in several different tissues, including the antennal sensilla, the taste system, and chemosensory organs. They are also known to be ectopically expressed in tissues such as the gut.

Genomic analysis of Drosophila and other insect species (Anopheles gambiae, Apis mellifera, Bombyx mori, and Triboliumcastaneum) has revealed that the OBP genes significantly differ between species. The OBP family contains 21 (in A. mellifera) to 66 genes (in A. gambiae), whereas it ranges from 52 members in Drosophila to 20 in T. castaneum. Generally these genes are irregularly scattered across the genome. Most (69% of the OBP genes in Drosophila) are arranged in small clusters from 2 to 6 OBP genes. The Drosophila OBP gene family has been classified into several subfamilies based on structural features, functional information, and phylogenetic relationships: the Classic, Minus-C, Plus-C, Dimer, PBP/GOBP, ABPI and ABPII, CRLBP, and D7 subfamilies. These subfamilies are unequally distributed across arthropods, even among the dipterans and are totally absent in some species.

== See also ==
- Insect pheromone-binding protein
- Odorant
- Olfactory receptor
- Olfactory receptor neuron
