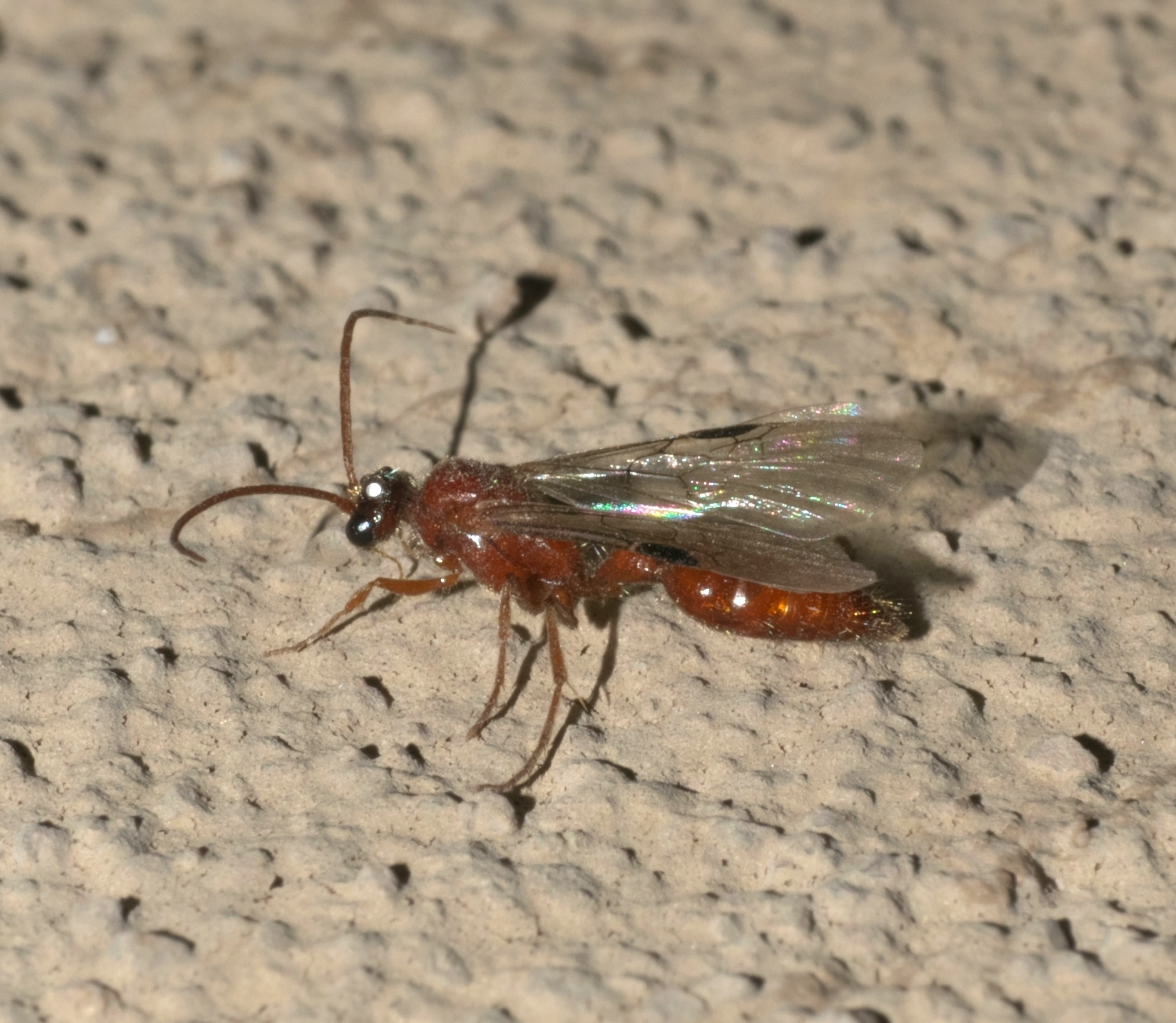
- Brachycistis, Idaho

Scientific classification
- Kingdom: Animalia
- Phylum: Arthropoda
- Class: Insecta
- Order: Hymenoptera
- Family: Tiphiidae
- Subfamily: Brachycistidinae
- Genus: Brachycistis; Fox, 1893

= Brachycistis =

Genus of wasps

Brachycistis is a genus of wasps in the family Tiphiidae found in North America.
