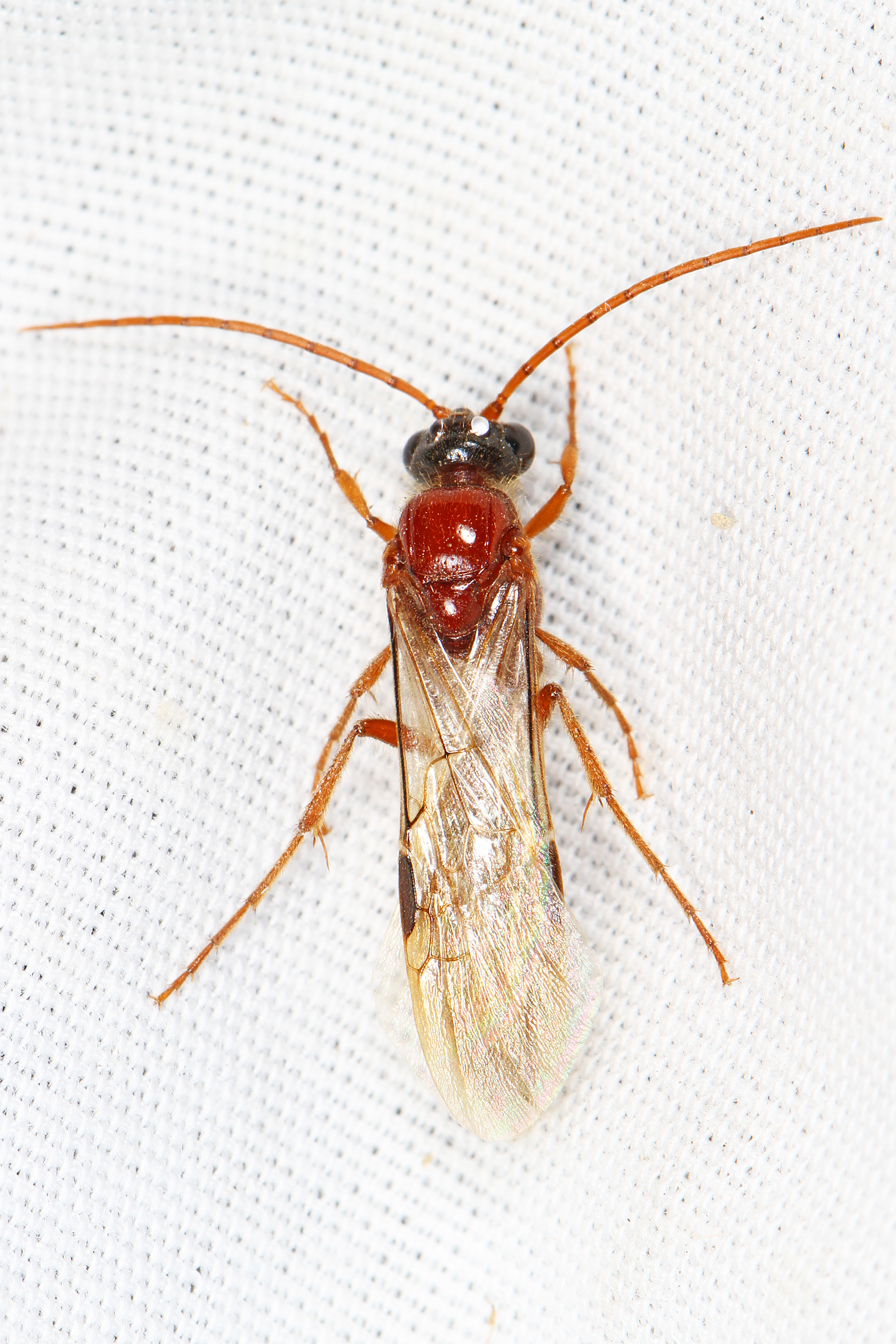
- Tiphiid Wasp species of the Brachycistidinae subfamily, from the Great Basin National Park, Baker, Nevada

Scientific classification
- Domain: Eukaryota
- Kingdom: Animalia
- Phylum: Arthropoda
- Class: Insecta
- Order: Hymenoptera
- Family: Tiphiidae
- Subfamily: Brachycistidinae; Kimsey 1991

Genera
- See text

= Brachycistidinae =

Subfamily of wasps

Brachycistidinae is a subfamily of the flower wasp family Tiphiidae that contains 10 genera and 85 species, and which is confined to the Nearctic zoogeographic region.

== Distinguishing Characters ==
The wasps in the subfamily Brachycistidinae are distinguished from the subfamily Tiphiinae by having simple claws and the lack of an epicnemial suture, while the tegulae do not cover the axillary sclerites of the fore wings. These wasps demonstrate extreme sexual dimorphism; the females resemble ants and are wingless, while the males are winged and nocturnal. These extreme differences between the sexes have led to instances where the males and females are described as separate species, known as "dual taxonomy", and later work shows the two "species" to be synonymous. The identification of both sexes as a single species is often only achieved when they are collected in copula.

== Biology ==
The female wasps of the family Tiphiidae are mainly ectoparasitic on fossorial beetle larvae, especially members of the family Scarabaeidae and carabid subfamily Cicindelinae, known as tiger beetles. The nocturnal, winged males are often attracted to lights, so are well represented in museum collections; the wingless females mainly live underground and are more difficult to collect, although they do emerge at night when they may also be attracted to lights. Few observations of the hosts of Brachycistidinae have been made, but a female of the genus Stilbopogon was observed stinging a beetle larva that was identified as belonging to a species of darkling beetle probably a species within the genus Eusattus.

== Taxonomy ==
The taxonomy of the subfamily is difficult to resolve due to similarity of the structures of the species and their lack of distinctive colouration and patterning. However, the males show a number of distinguishing characters in the structures of their genitalia, heads, thoraces, and the venation of their wings.

=== Taxonomy according to Kimsey and Wasbauer (2006) ===
The following genera are currently placed within the Brachycistidinae in two well-supported clades:

==== Clade one ====
- Brachymaya Kimsey & Wasbauer 1999
- Hadrocistis Wasbauer, 1968
- Brachycistina Malloch, 1926

==== Clade two ====
- Paraquemaya Kimsey & Wasbauer, 1999
- Brachycistellus Baker, 1907
- Dolichetropis Wasbauer, 1968
- Sedomaya Kimsey & Wasbauer, 1999
- Brachycistis Fox, 1893
- Acanthetropis Wasbauer, 1958
- Colocistis Krombein, 1942

=== Taxonomy according to Kimsey (2006) ===
A phylogenetic analysis using females suggested a different phylogeny, but the true relationships of the genera in the subfamily will probably remain uncertain until a DNA based phylogenetic study can be undertaken.

The female-based phylogeny was:

==== Clade one ====
- Colocistis Krombein, 1942
- Brachycistis Fox, 1893
- Glyptacros Mickel & Krombein, 1942

==== Clade two ====
- Stilbopogon Mickel & Krombein, 1942
- Unnamed Genus A
