= Tiphia minuta =

Scientific classification
- Domain: Eukaryota
- Kingdom: Animalia
- Phylum: Arthropoda
- Class: Insecta
- Order: Hymenoptera
- Family: Tiphiidae
- Subfamily: Tiphiinae
- Genus: Tiphia
- Species: T. minuta

Binomial name
- Tiphia minuta Linden 1827

Species of wasp

Tiphia minuta is a Palearctic species of tiphiid wasp.
