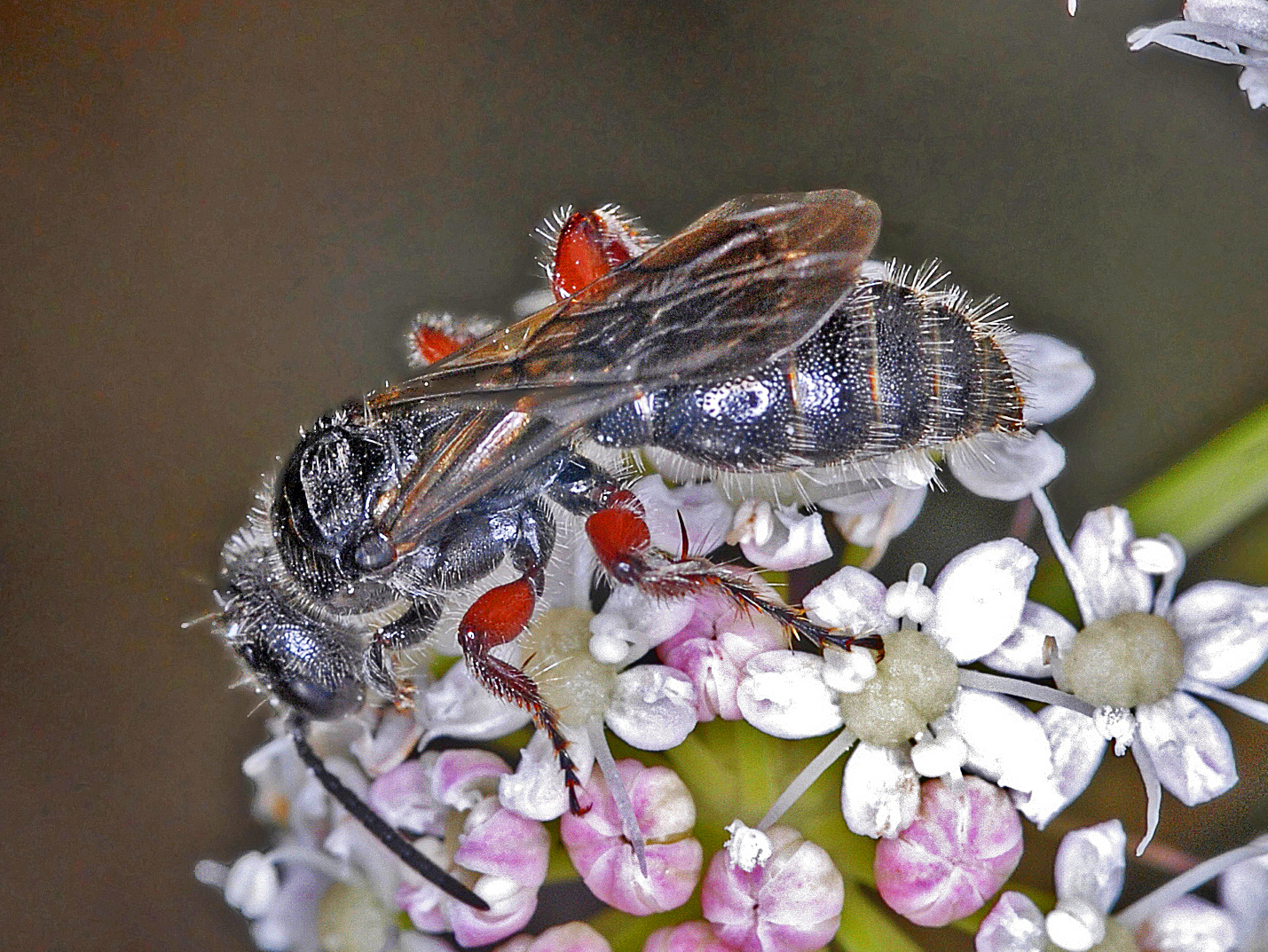
- Tiphia femorata

Scientific classification
- Domain: Eukaryota
- Kingdom: Animalia
- Phylum: Arthropoda
- Class: Insecta
- Order: Hymenoptera
- Family: Tiphiidae
- Subfamily: Tiphiinae
- Genus: Tiphia; Fabricius, 1775

= Tiphia =

Genus of wasps

Tiphia is a genus of wasps belonging to the family Tiphiidae, subfamily Tiphiinae. They feed on soil-inhabiting scarab beetle larvae.

The species Tiphia vernalis has been introduced in the United States from Korea and China in 1925 to combat the Japanese beetle (Popillia japonica). T. vernalis has also fed on the oriental beetle (Anomala orientalis) in laboratory settings and in a nursery; thus, it is being proposed as a possible pest control method for A. orientalis.

== Species ==
- Tiphia abnormis Eversmann, 1849
- Tiphia alishana Ishikawa, 1967
- Tiphia ami Tsuneki, 1986
- Tiphia annulata Fabricius, 1793
- Tiphia antigae Tournier, 1901
- Tiphia arthroxantha Boni Bartalucci, 2011
- Tiphia austriaca Tournier, 1889
- Tiphia bexar Nagy, 1967
- Tiphia brevala Zhang, 1989
- Tiphia bunun Tsuneki, 1986
- Tiphia chareshi
- Tiphia changi Tsuneki, 1986
- Tiphia chihpenchia Tsuneki, 1986
- Tiphia chungshani Tsuneki, 1986
- Tiphia copidosoma Nagy, 1967
- Tiphia dimidiata Zhang et al., 1994
- Tiphia distincta Tournier, 1889
- Tiphia dolichogaster Zhang, 1989
- Tiphia elachia Boni Bartalucci, 2011
- Tiphia eremopolites Boni Bartalucci, 2011
- Tiphia femorata Fabricius, 1775
- Tiphia fenchihuensis Tsuneki, 1986
- Tiphia flavipes Tsuneki, 1986
- Tiphia formosensis Tsuneki, 1986
- Tiphia fortidentata Tsuneki, 1986
- Tiphia fukuii Tsuneki, 1986
- Tiphia hispanica Dusmet y Alonso, 1930
- Tiphia hokkien Tsuneki, 1986
- Tiphia horiana Tsuneki, 1986
- Tiphia ilanensis Tsuneki, 1986
- Tiphia impossibilis Arbouw, 1985
- Tiphia iracunda Nagy, 1967
- Tiphia kashmirensis Hanima & Girish Kumar, 2019
- Tiphia komaii Tsuneki, 1986
- Tiphia kotoshensis Tsuneki, 1986
- Tiphia laeviceps Tournier, 1889
- Tiphia latipes Walker, 1871
- Tiphia lepeletieri Berland, 1925
- Tiphia lihyuehtana Tsuneki, 1986
- Tiphia maior Mocsáry, 1883
- Tiphia mediovena Zhang, 1989
- Tiphia minuta Linden, 1827
- Tiphia morio Fabricius, 1787
- Tiphia ordinaria (Smith, 1873)
- Tiphia parallela Smith, 1879
- Tiphia paupi Allen & Krombein, 1961
- Tiphia pempuchiensis Tsuneki, 1986
- Tiphia picta Schulthess, 1893
- Tiphia piqua Tsuneki, 1986
- Tiphia popilliavora Rohwer
- Tiphia puliensis Tsuneki, 1986
- Tiphia rara Zhang et al., 1994
- Tiphia rufomandibulata Smith 1873
- Tiphia sabaea Boni Bartalucci, 2011
- Tiphia sareptana Tournier, 1889
- Tiphia semipolita Tournier, 1889
- Tiphia sternocarinata Allen & Jaynes, 1930
- Tiphia taiwana Ishikawa, 1967
- Tiphia takasago Tsuneki, 1986
- Tiphia triangulata Tsuneki, 1986
- Tiphia tsukengensis Tsuneki, 1986
- Tiphia unicolor Lepeletier de Saint Fargeau, 1845
- Tiphia vallicola Tsuneki, 1986
- Tiphia varia Zhang, 1989
- Tiphia vernalis Rohwer, 1924
- Tiphia wushensis Tsuneki, 1986
- Tiphia yanoi Tsuneki, 1986
- Tiphia yushana Tsuneki, 1986
