= Insect pheromone-binding protein =

Family of small helical proteins

Insect pheromone-binding family, A10/OS-D
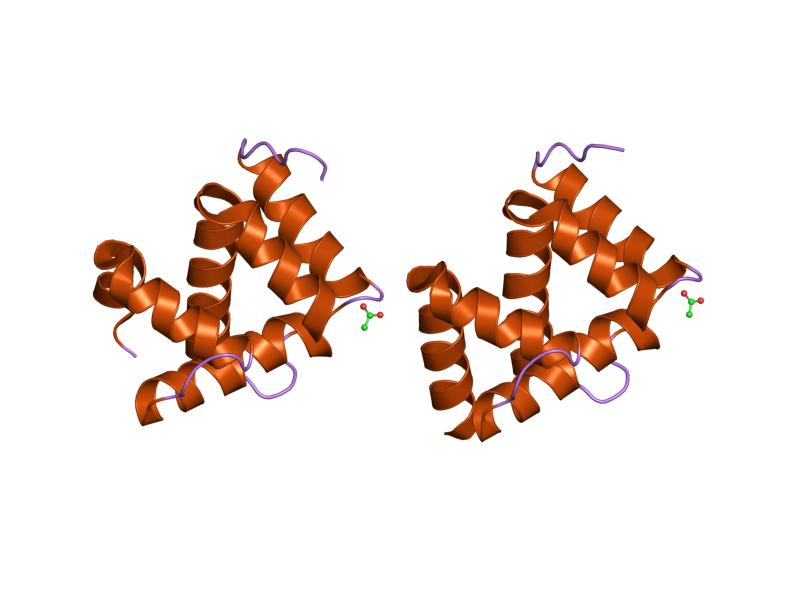
- antennal chemosensory protein a6 from the moth mamestra brassicae

Identifiers
- Symbol: OS-D
- Pfam: PF03392
- InterPro: IPR005055
- SCOP2: 1n8v / SCOPe / SUPFAM
- OPM superfamily: 312
- OPM protein: 1ow4
Available protein structures:
- PDB: IPR005055 PF03392 (ECOD; PDBsum)
- AlphaFold: IPR005055; PF03392

In molecular biology, the insect pheromone-binding family A10/OS-D is a family of small helical proteins postulated to contribute to the specificity of the insect’s olfactory system by binding components of the natural pheromone mixtures.

A class of small (14-20 Kd) water-soluble proteins, called pheromone binding proteins, first discovered in the insect sensillar lymph but also found in the mucus of vertebrates, is postulated to mediate the solubilisation of hydrophobic odorant molecules, and thereby to facilitate their transport to the receptor neurons. The product of a gene expressed in the olfactory system of Drosophila melanogaster (Fruit fly), OS-D, shares features common to vertebrate odorant binding proteins, but has a primary structure unlike odorant-binding proteins. OS-D derivatives have subsequently been found in chemosensory organs of phylogenetically distinct insects, including cockroaches, phasmids and moths, suggesting that OS-D-like proteins seem to be conserved in the insect phylum. OS-D and related proteins are members of the insect pheromone-binding family A10/OS-D.
