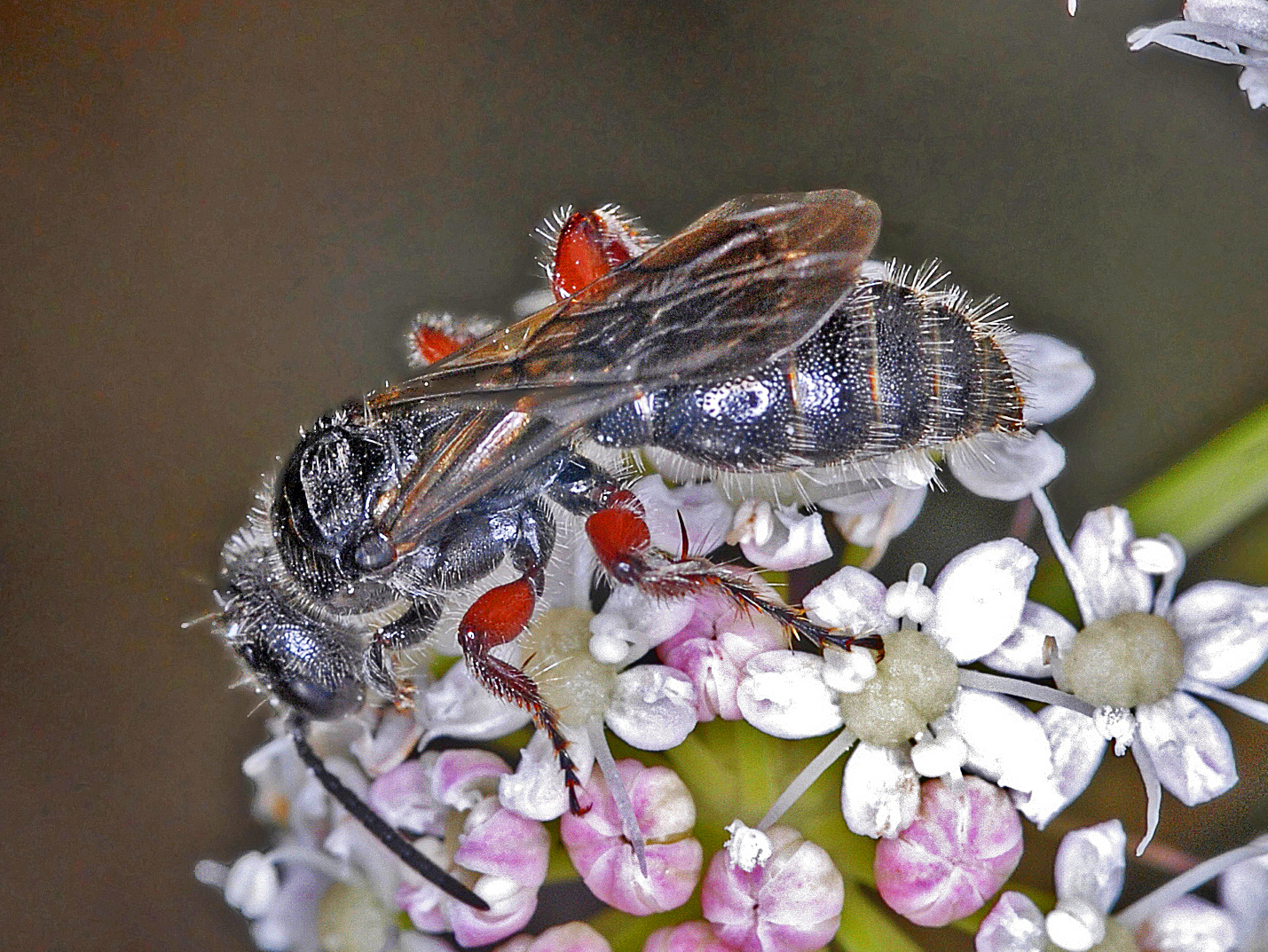
- Tiphia femorata. Val Noci, Genoa, Italy

Scientific classification
- Domain: Eukaryota
- Kingdom: Animalia
- Phylum: Arthropoda
- Class: Insecta
- Order: Hymenoptera
- Family: Tiphiidae
- Subfamily: Tiphiinae; Leach, 1815

Genera
- See text

= Tiphiinae =

Subfamily of wasps

Tiphiinae is one of the two subfamilies of the flower wasp family Tiphiidae, the other being the Nearctic Brachycistidinae. Tiphiinae is the larger of the two and has a worldwide distribution.

== Description and identification ==
Tiphiinae are small to medium sized solitary wasps, up to 25 mm in length. The eyes are ovate and do not demonstrate emargination. The males have 10-13 antennal segments while the females have 10-12. The antennae may, or may not be, bent at a sharp angle. The thorax is normally coloured orange-red or black and the thorax of the wingless females has distinct dorsal segmentation. The pronotum is long and extends posteriorly towards the tegulae. The spiracle cover lobes on the pronotum are lined with close fine hairs. There is no suture on the mesopleuron. Wings are present in all males but females may be winged or wingless. If wings are present they are not folded longitudinally. Fore-wings have a distinct pterostigma; and the wing venation is well developed. The legs show a fore femur which is not obviously thickened.

== Taxonomy ==
The following genera are included in the subfamily Tiphiinae:

- Cabaraxa Nagy, 1974
- Cyanotiphia Cameron, 1907
- Epomidiopteron Romand, 1835
- Icronatha Nagy, 1967
- Krombeinia Pate, 1947
- Ludita Nagy, 1967
- Mallochessa Allen, 1972
- Megatiphia Kimsey, 1993
- Neotiphia Malloch, 1918
- Paratiphia Sichel, 1864
- Pseudotiphia Ashmead 1903
- Tiphia Fabricius, 1775

== Gallery ==
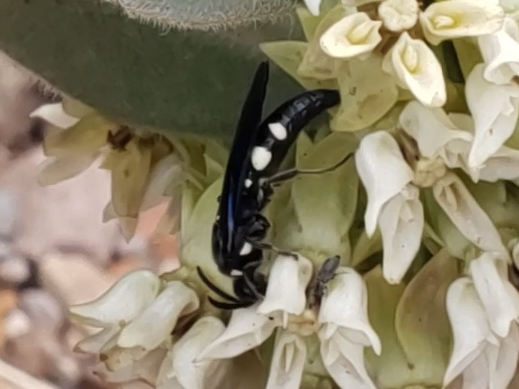
Epomidiopteron julii in Chihuahua, Mexico

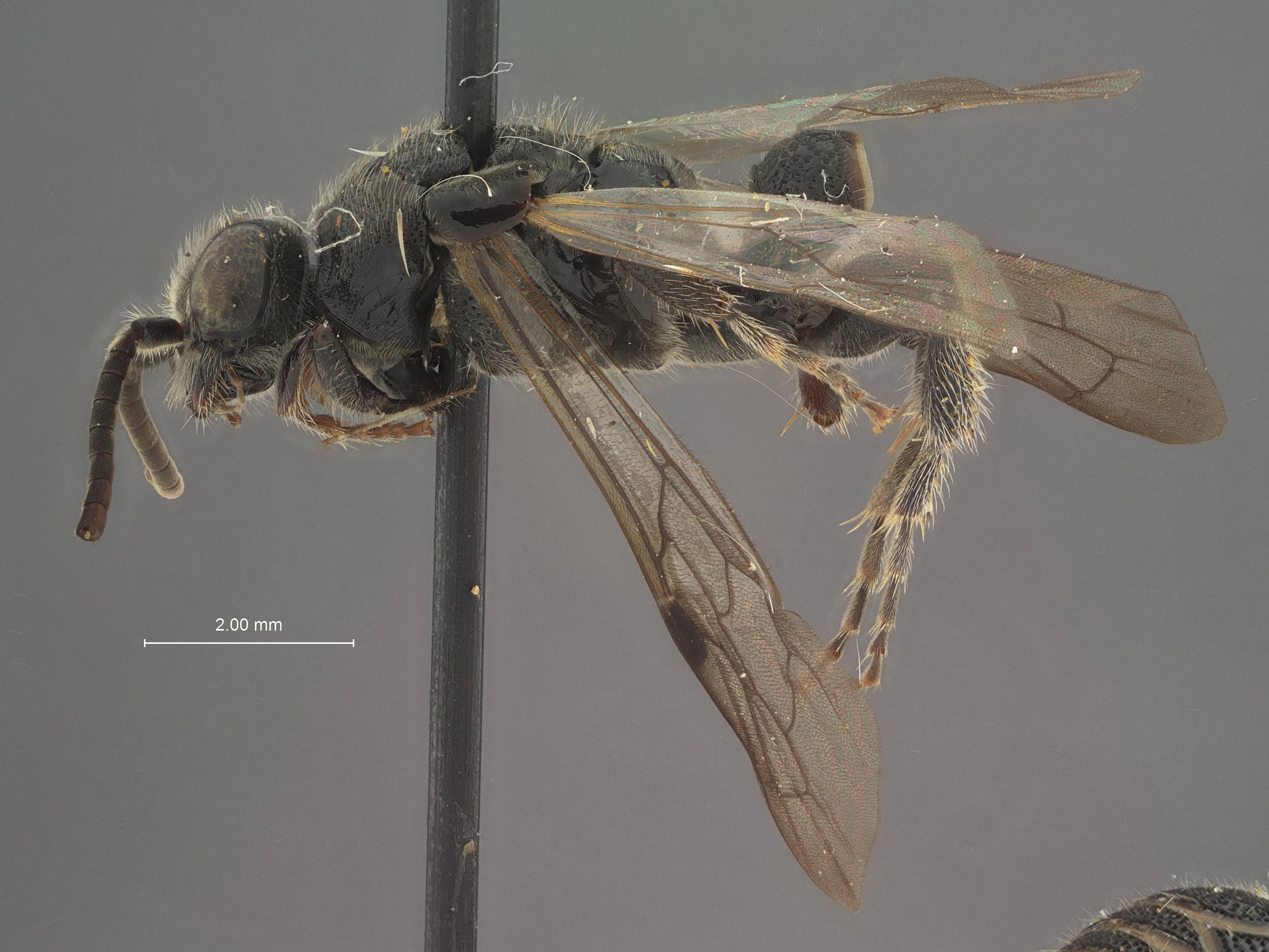
Krombeinia nayarita holotype from Nayarit, Mexico

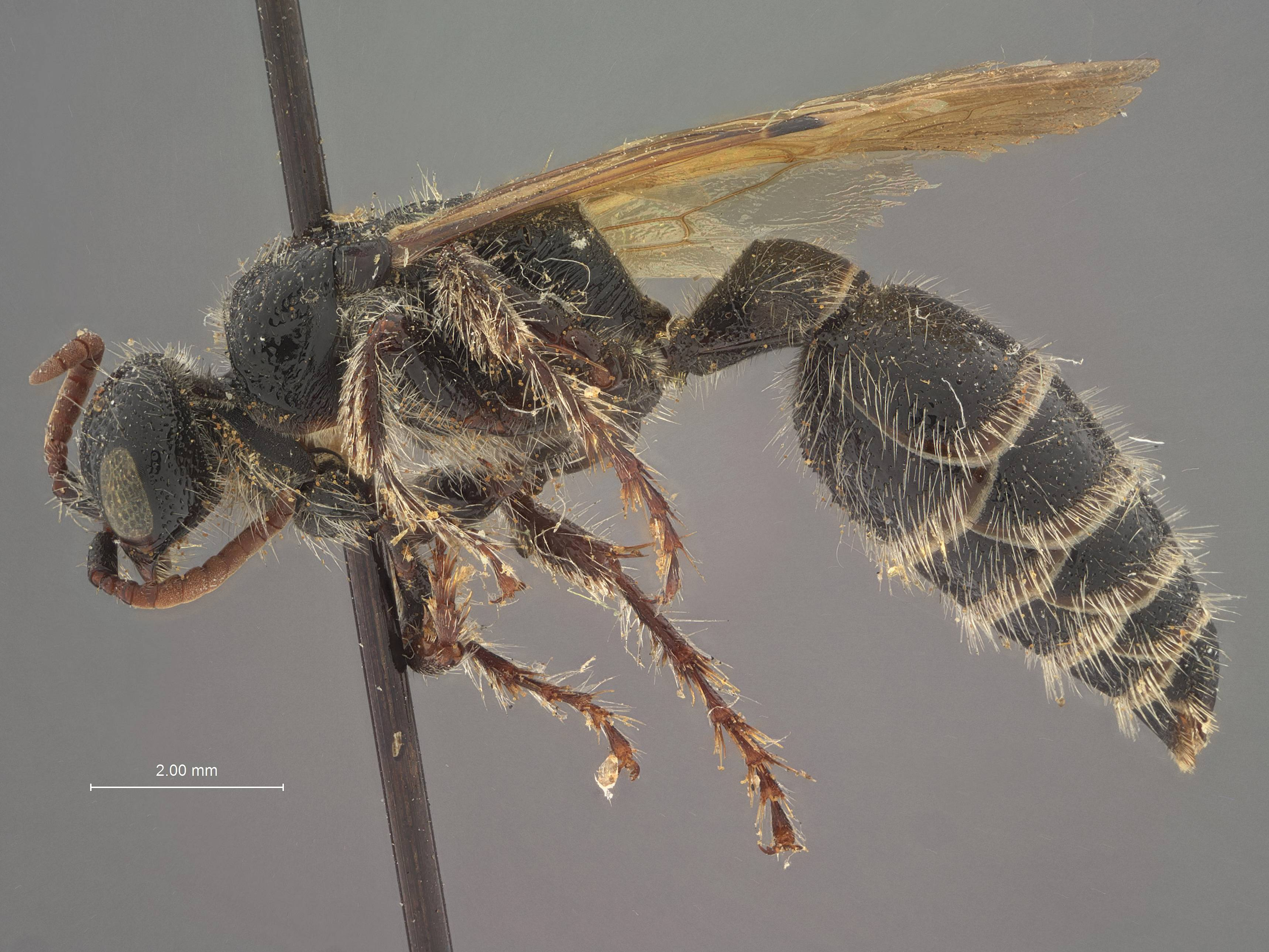
Neotiphia crawfordi holotype from Texas

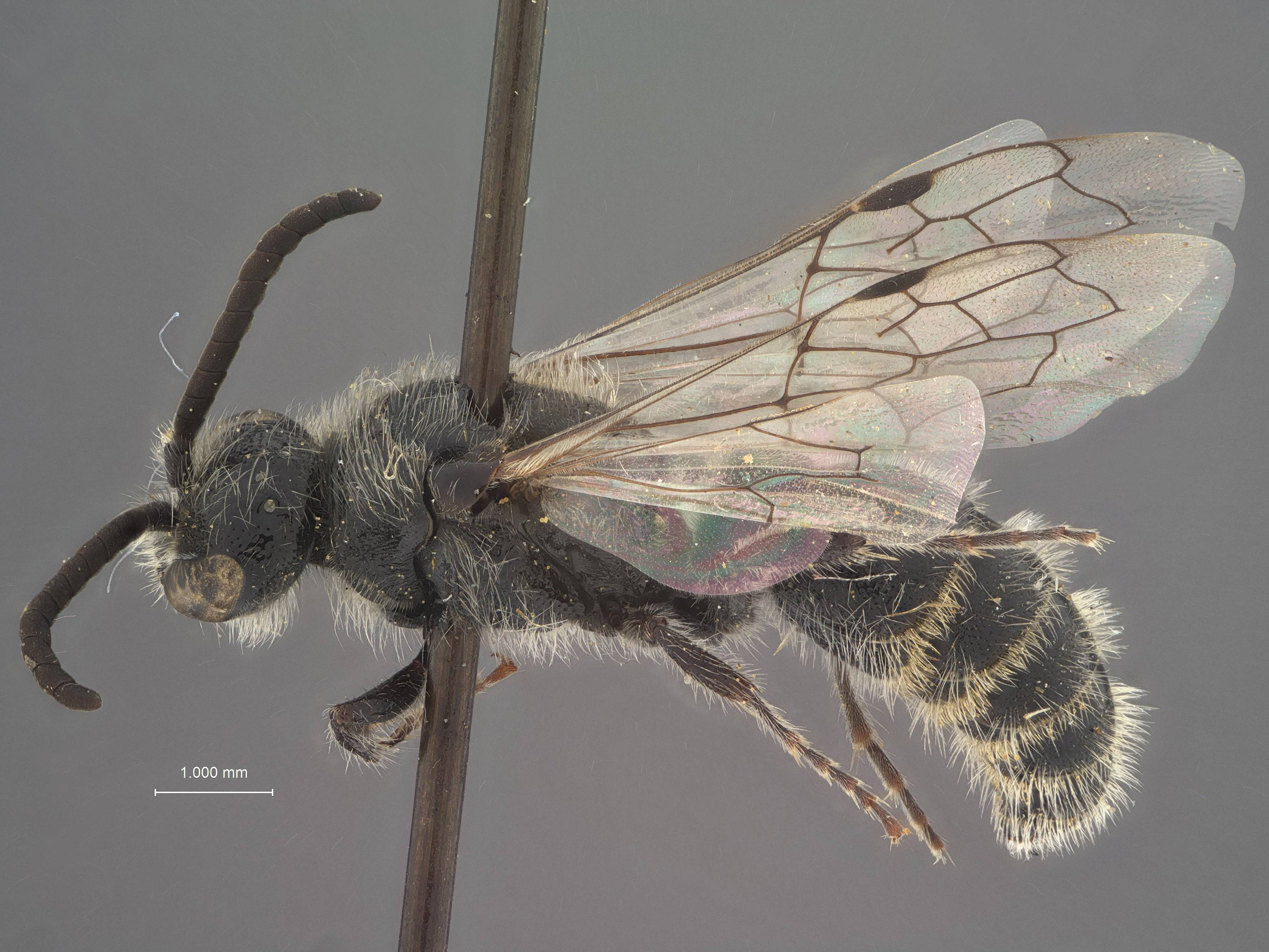
Paratiphia lagosae holotype from Jalisco, Mexico

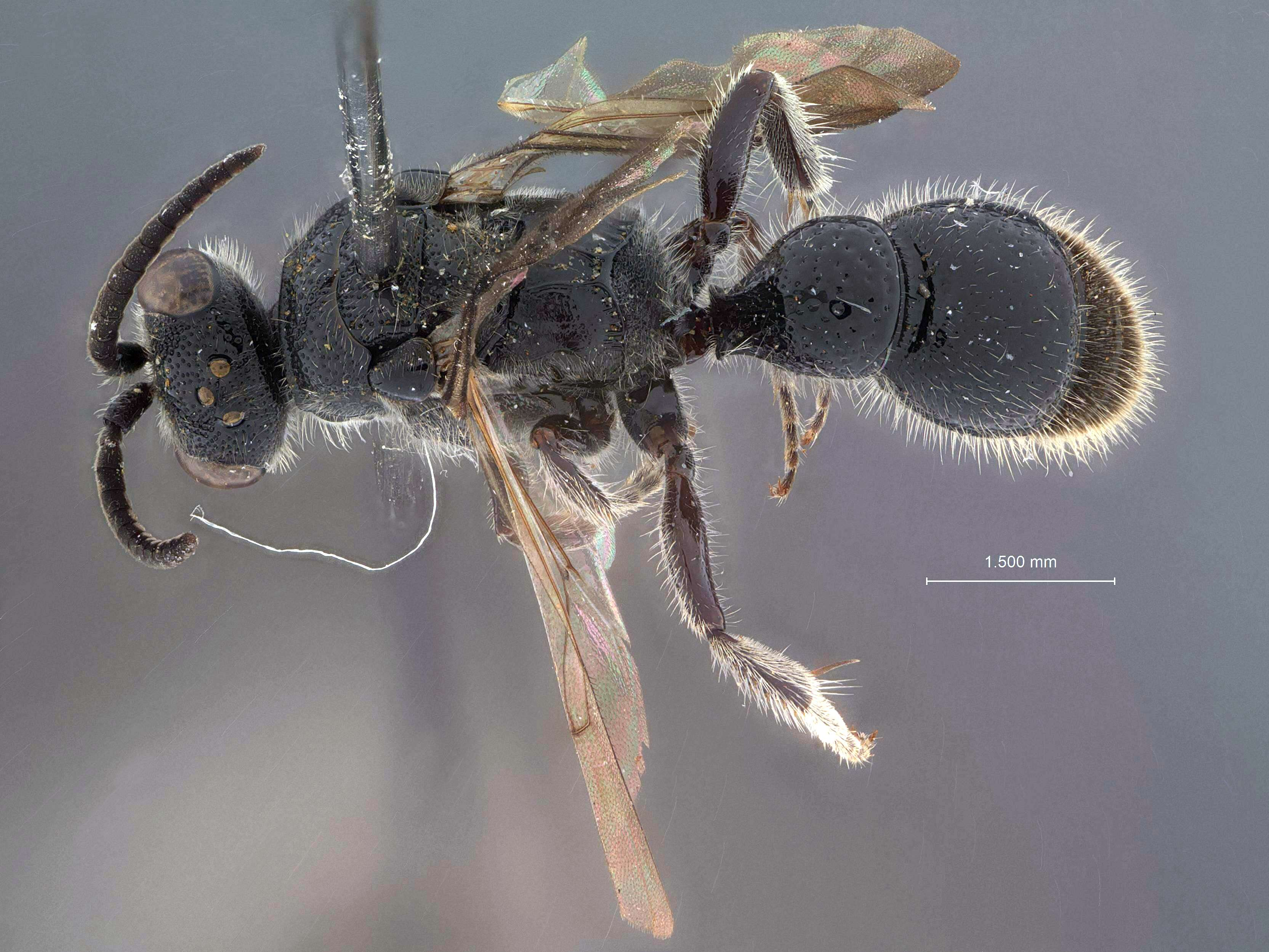
Tiphia ami holotype from Taiwan
