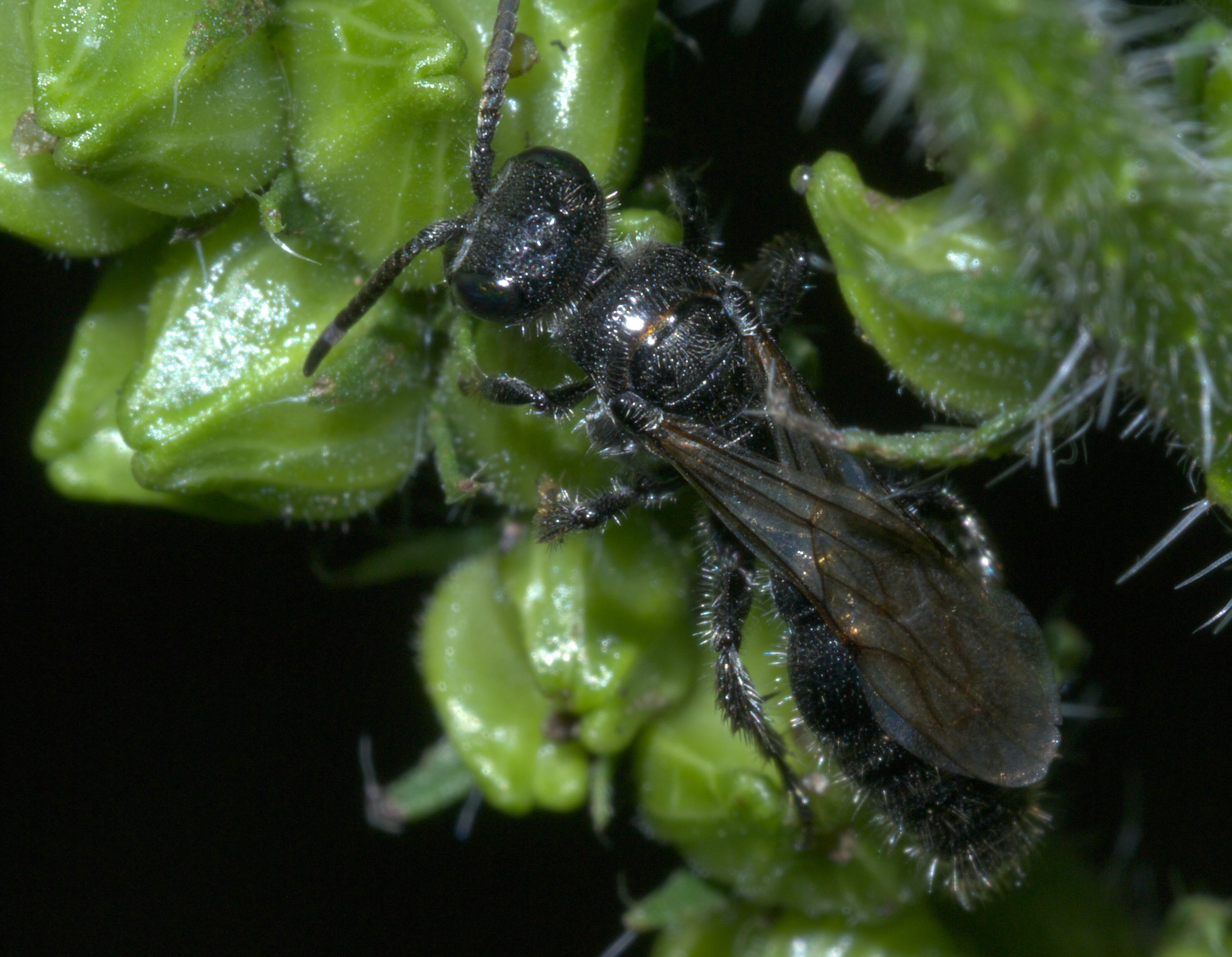
- Tiphia sp.

Scientific classification
- Kingdom: Animalia
- Phylum: Arthropoda
- Clade: Pancrustacea
- Class: Insecta
- Order: Hymenoptera
- Superfamily: Tiphioidea
- Family: Tiphiidae; Leach, 1815

Subfamilies
- Brachycistidinae Kimsey, 1991; Tiphiinae Leach, 1815

= Tiphiidae =

Tiphiid wasps

Family of insects

The Tiphiidae (also known as tiphiid wasps, flower wasps, (Note: Not to be confused with other flower wasps in Mutillidae, Scoliidae, or Thynnidae.) or tiphiid flower wasps) are a family of large, solitary wasps whose larvae are parasitoids of various beetle larvae, especially those in the superfamily Scarabaeoidea. Until recently, this family contained several additional subfamilies, but multiple studies have independently confirmed that these comprise a separate lineage, and are now classified in the family Thynnidae.

The females of some Brachycistidinae are wingless, and hunt ground-dwelling (fossorial) beetle larvae. The prey is paralysed with the female's sting, and an egg is laid on it so the wasp larva has a ready supply of food. As some of the ground-dwelling scarab species attacked by tiphiids are pests, some of these wasps are considered beneficial as biological control agents.

== Taxonomy ==
Tiphiid genera are classified as follows:

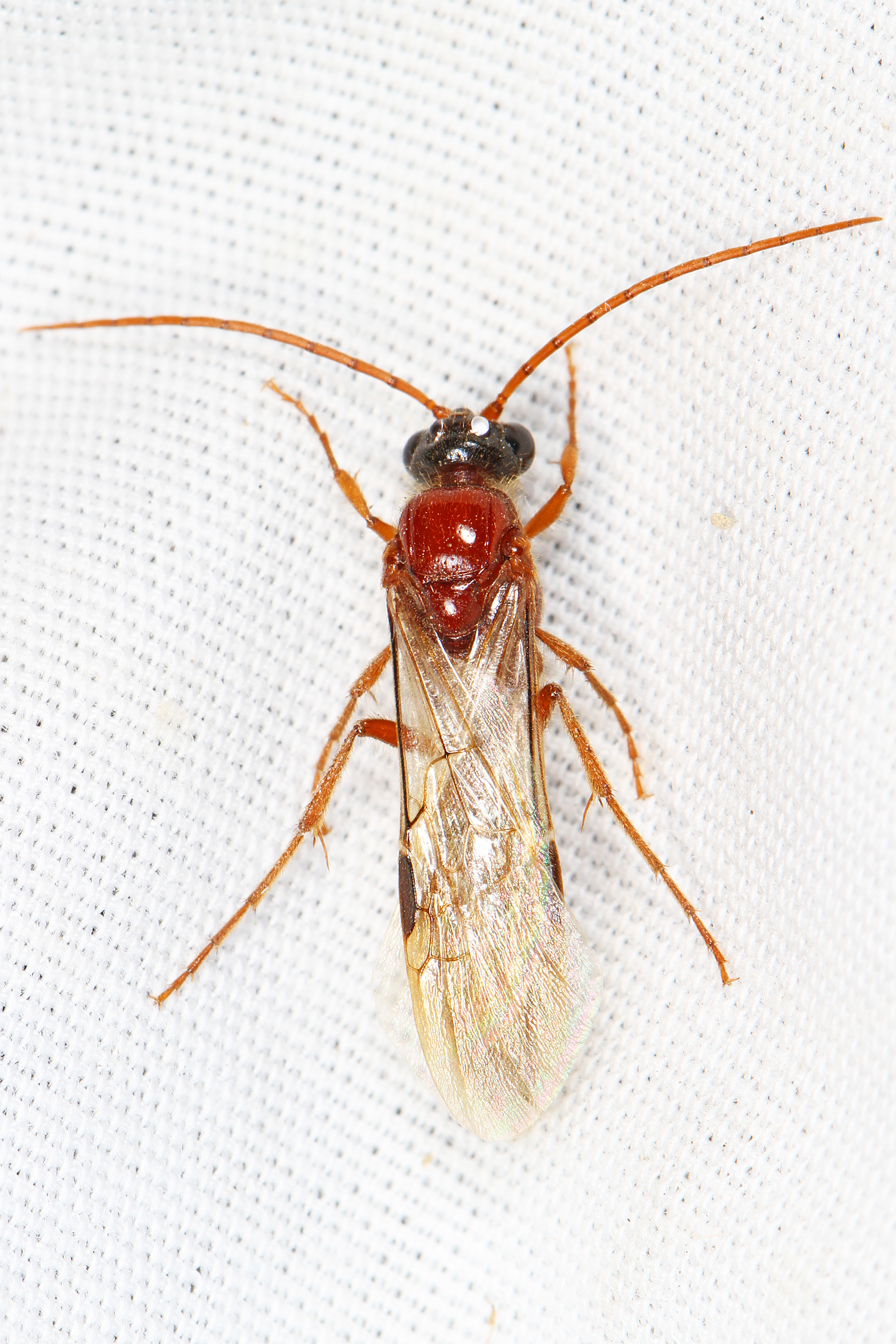
The male of a species of Brachycistidinae photographed in Nevada

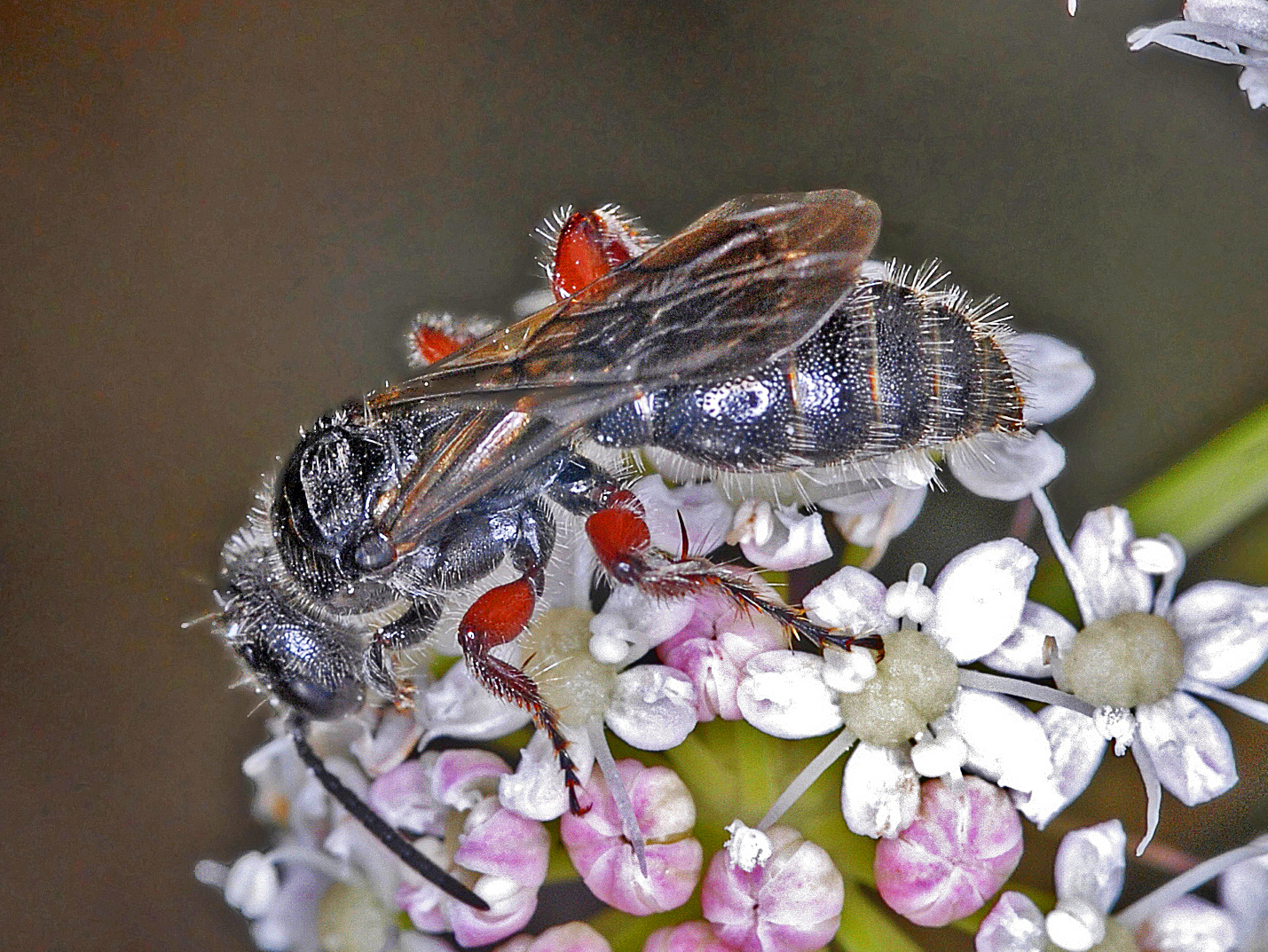
A female Tiphia femorata photographed in Italy

=== Subfamily Brachycistidinae Kimsey, 1991 ===
- Acanthetropis Wasbauer, 1958
- Brachycistellus Baker, 1907
- Brachycistina Malloch, 1926
- Brachycistis Fox, 1893
- Brachymaya Kimsey & Wasbauer 1999
- Colocistis Krombein, 1942
- Dolichetropis Wasbauer, 1968
- Glyptacros Mickel & Krombein, 1942
- Hadrocistis Wasbauer, 1968
- Paraquemaya Kimsey & Wasbauer, 1999
- Sedomaya Kimsey & Wasbauer, 1999
- Stilbopogon Mickel & Krombein, 1942

=== Subfamily Tiphiinae Leach, 1815 ===
- Cabaraxa Nagy, 1974
- Cyanotiphia Cameron, 1907
- Epomidiopteron Romand, 1835
- Icronatha Nagy, 1967
- Krombeinia Pate, 1947
- Ludita Nagy, 1967
- Mallochessa Allen, 1972
- Megatiphia Kimsey, 1993
- Neotiphia Malloch, 1918
- Paratiphia Sichel, 1864
- † Philoponites Cockerell, 1915
- Pseudotiphia Ashmead 1903
- Tiphia Fabricius, 1775

== Examples ==
- Tiphia femorata Linden 1827
- Tiphia minuta Fabricius, 1775
