= C15H20O2 =

The molecular formula C_{15}H_{20}O_{2} (molar mass: 232.32 g/mol) may refer to:

- Costunolide
- Dictyophorine
- Echinopine A
- Helenin
- Nootkatin
- Velleral (2,2,8-trimethyl-3,3a,8,8a-tetrahydro-1H-azulene-5,6-dicarbaldehyde)
