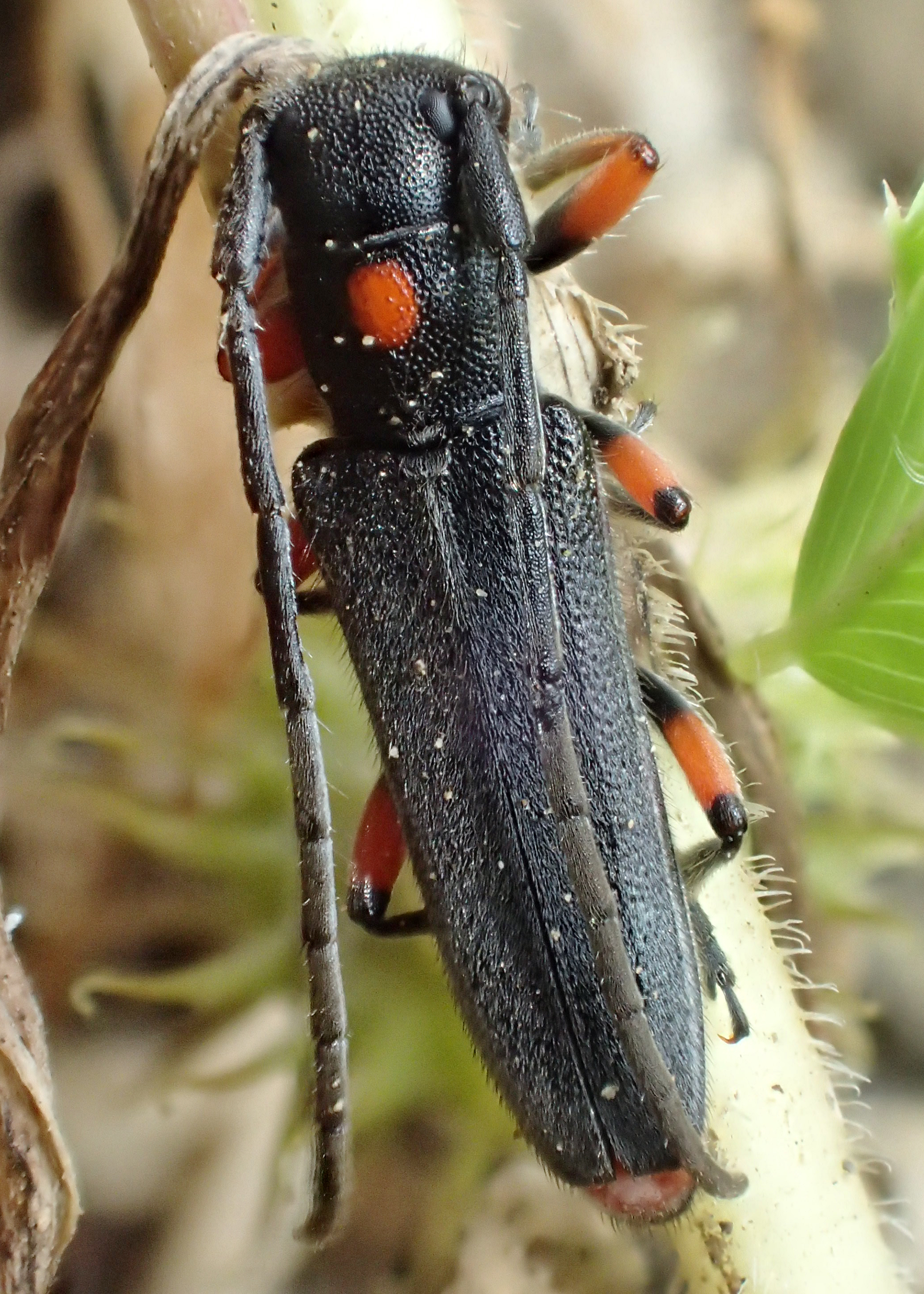

Scientific classification
- Domain: Eukaryota
- Kingdom: Animalia
- Phylum: Arthropoda
- Class: Insecta
- Order: Coleoptera
- Suborder: Polyphaga
- Infraorder: Cucujiformia
- Family: Cerambycidae
- Genus: Phytoecia
- Species: P. virgula

Binomial name
- Phytoecia virgula (Charpentier, 1825)

Synonyms
- Saperda virgula Charpentier, 1825

= Phytoecia virgula =

Species of beetle

Phytoecia virgula is a species of beetle from the subfamily Lamiinae.

== Description ==
Adults have a length of 6–12 millimetres (0.24–0.47 in). They can be found from April to July.

== Distribution ==
From Europe, Turkey and Russia to the Caucasus, the Middle East and Kazakhstan.

== Development ==
The life cycle lasts a year. They feed on a wide variety of plants and grasses, including Achillea millefolium, wormwood (Artemisia), carrot (Daucus), tansy (Tanacetum), Inula and hawkweed (Hieracium).
