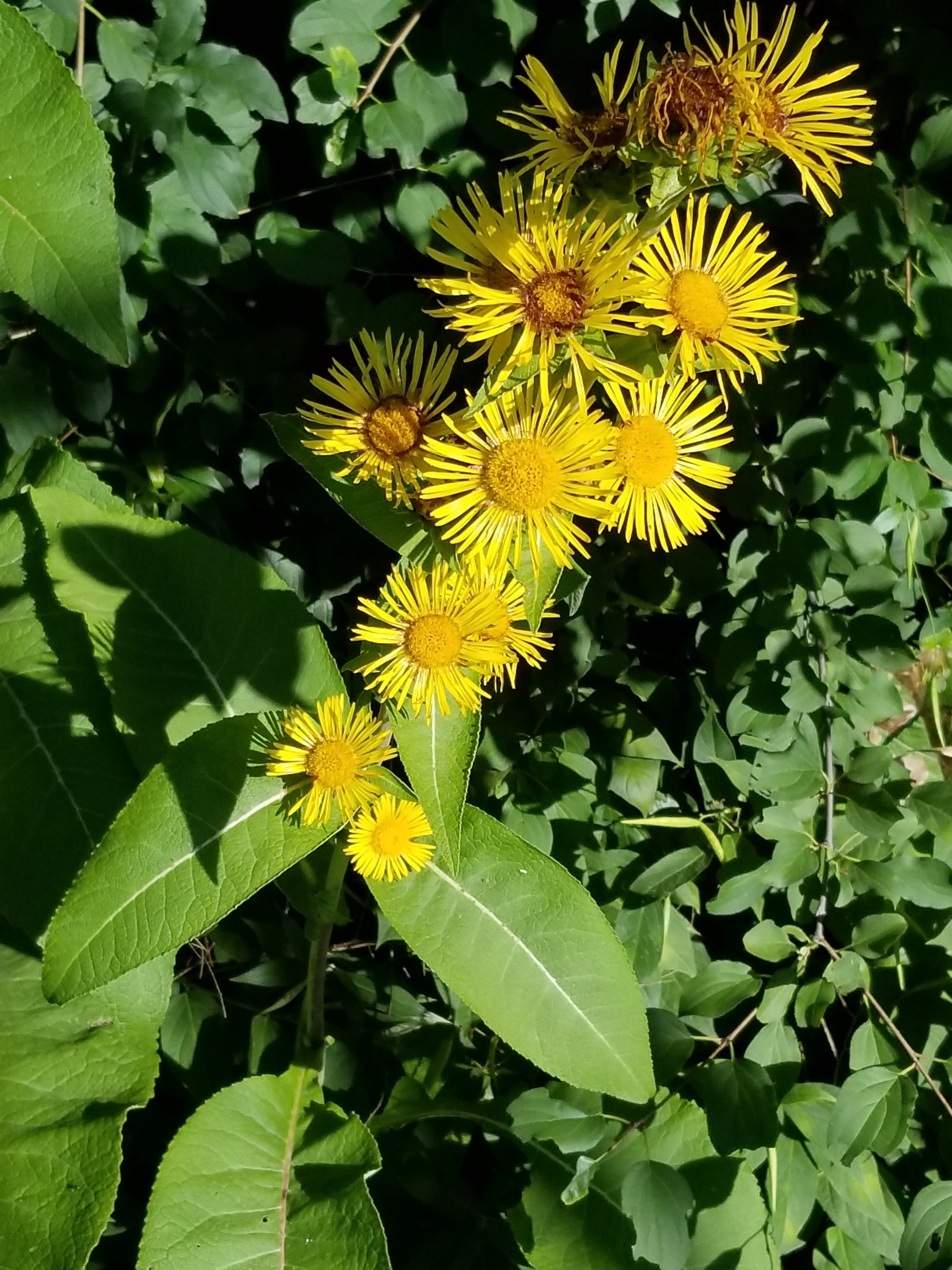

Scientific classification
- Kingdom: Plantae
- Clade: Tracheophytes
- Clade: Angiosperms
- Clade: Eudicots
- Clade: Asterids
- Order: Asterales
- Family: Asteraceae
- Genus: Inula
- Species: I. racemosa

Binomial name
- Inula racemosa Hook.f. 1881

Synonyms
- Helenium racemosum Kuntze; Inula helenium Hook.f. & Thomson; Inula royleana C.B.Clarke

= Inula racemosa =

Species of flowering plant

Inula racemosa is an Asian plant in the daisy family native to the temperate and alpine western Himalayas of Xinjiang, Afghanistan, Kashmir, Nepal, Pakistan. Seeds are positive photoblastic thus require light for germination or show surface germination

The roots are widely used locally in indigenous medicine as an expectorant and in veterinary medicine as a tonic. It has also been introduced as an ornamental plant and medicinal herb in many countries.
