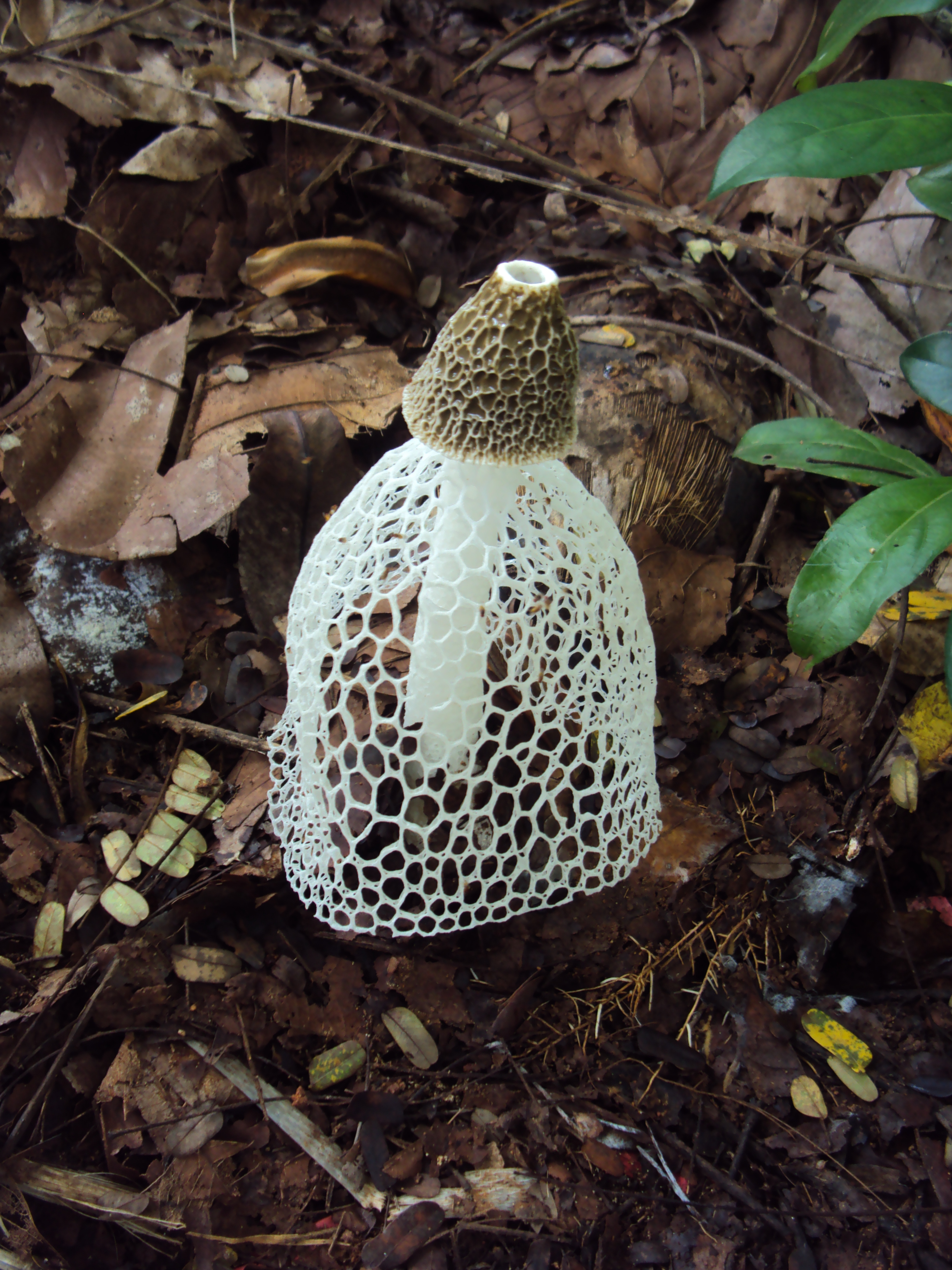

Scientific classification
- Kingdom: Fungi
- Division: Basidiomycota
- Class: Agaricomycetes
- Order: Phallales
- Family: Phallaceae
- Genus: Phallus
- Species: P. indusiatus

Binomial name
- Phallus indusiatus Vent. (1798)

Synonyms
- Dictyophora indusiata (Vent.) Desv. (1809); Hymenophallus indusiatus (Vent.) Nees (1817)

= Phallus indusiatus =

Widespread species of stinkhorn fungus

Phallus indusiatus
- Mycological characteristics
- Glebal hymenium
- Cap is conical
- Spore print is olive
- Ecology is saprotrophic
- Edibility is choice

Phallus indusiatus, commonly called the basket stinkhorn, bamboo mushrooms, bamboo pith, long net stinkhorn, crinoline stinkhorn, bridal veil, or veiled lady, is a species of fungus in the family Phallaceae, known as stinkhorns. First described scientifically in 1798 by French botanist Étienne Pierre Ventenat, the species has often been referred to a separate genus Dictyophora along with other Phallus species featuring an indusium.

The fruit body is characterised by a conical to bell-shaped cap on a stalk and a delicate lacy "skirt", or indusium, that hangs from beneath the cap and reaches nearly to the ground. The mature fruit bodies are up to 25 centimetres (10 inches) tall with a conical to bell-shaped cap that is 1.5–4 cm (1/2–1 1/2 in) wide. The cap is covered with a greenish-brown spore-containing slime, which attracts flies and other insects that eat the spores and disperse them. P. indusiatus can be distinguished from similar species by differences in distribution, size, colour, and indusium length.

The species has a cosmopolitan distribution in tropical areas and is found in southern Asia, Africa, the Americas, and Australia. It grows in woodlands and gardens in rich soil and well-rotted woody material. An edible mushroom featured as an ingredient in Chinese haute cuisine, it is used in stir-fries and chicken soups. The mushroom, grown commercially and commonly sold in Asian markets, is rich in protein, carbohydrates, and dietary fiber. The mushroom also contains various bioactive compounds, and has antioxidant and antimicrobial properties. It has a recorded history of use in Chinese medicine extending back to the 7th century CE and features in Nigerian folklore.

== Taxonomy ==
Phallus indusiatus was initially described by French naturalist Étienne Pierre Ventenat in 1798, and sanctioned under that name by Christiaan Hendrik Persoon in 1801. One author anonymously gave his impressions of Ventenat's discovery in an 1800 publication:

This beautiful species, which is sufficiently characterised to distinguish it from every other individual of the class, is copiously produced in Dutch Guiana, about 300 paces from the sea, and nearly as far from the left bank of the river of Surinam. It was communicated to me by the elder Vaillant, (Note: Father of the more famous François Levaillant, explorer and ornithologist, the elder Levaillant was a merchant of Metz who served as French consul in Dutch Guiana until 1763.) who discovered it in 1755 on some raised ground which was never overflowed by the highest tides, and is formed of a very fine white sand, covered with a thin stratum of earth. The prodigious quantity of individuals of this species which grow at the same time, the very different periods of their expansion, the brilliancy and the varied shades of their colours, present a prospect truly picturesque.

The fungus was later placed in a new genus, Dictyophora, in 1809 by Nicaise Auguste Desvaux; it was then known for many years as Dictyophora indusiata. Christian Gottfried Daniel Nees von Esenbeck placed the species in Hymenophallus in 1817, as H. indusiatus. Both genera were eventually returned to synonyms of Phallus and the species is now known again by its original name.

Curtis Gates Lloyd described the variety rochesterensis in 1909, originally as a new species, Phallus rochesterensis. It was found in Kew, Australia. A form with a pink-coloured indusium was reported by Vincenzo de Cesati in 1879 as Hymenophallus roseus, and later called Dictyophora indusiata f. rosea by Yosio Kobayasi in 1965; it is synonymous with Phallus cinnabarinus. A taxon described in 1936 as Dictyophora lutea and variously known for years as Dictyophora indusiata f. lutea, D. indusiata f. aurantiaca, or Phallus indusiatus f. citrinus, was formally transferred to Phallus in 2008 as a distinct species, P. luteus.

=== Etymology ===
The specific epithet is the Latin adjective indūsǐātus, "wearing an undergarment". The former generic name Dictyophora is derived from the Ancient Greek words δίκτυον (diktyon, "net"), and φέρω (pherō, "to bear"), hence "bearing a net". Phallus indusiatus has many common names based on its appearance, including long net stinkhorn, crinoline stinkhorn, basket stinkhorn, bridal veil fungus, and veiled lady. The Japanese name Kinugasatake (衣笠茸 or キヌガサタケ), derived from the word kinugasa, refers to the wide-brimmed hats that featured a hanging silk veil to hide and protect the wearer's face. A Chinese common name that alludes to its typical growth habitat is "bamboo mushroom" (simplified Chinese: 竹荪; traditional Chinese: 竹蓀; pinyin: zhúsūn).

== Description ==
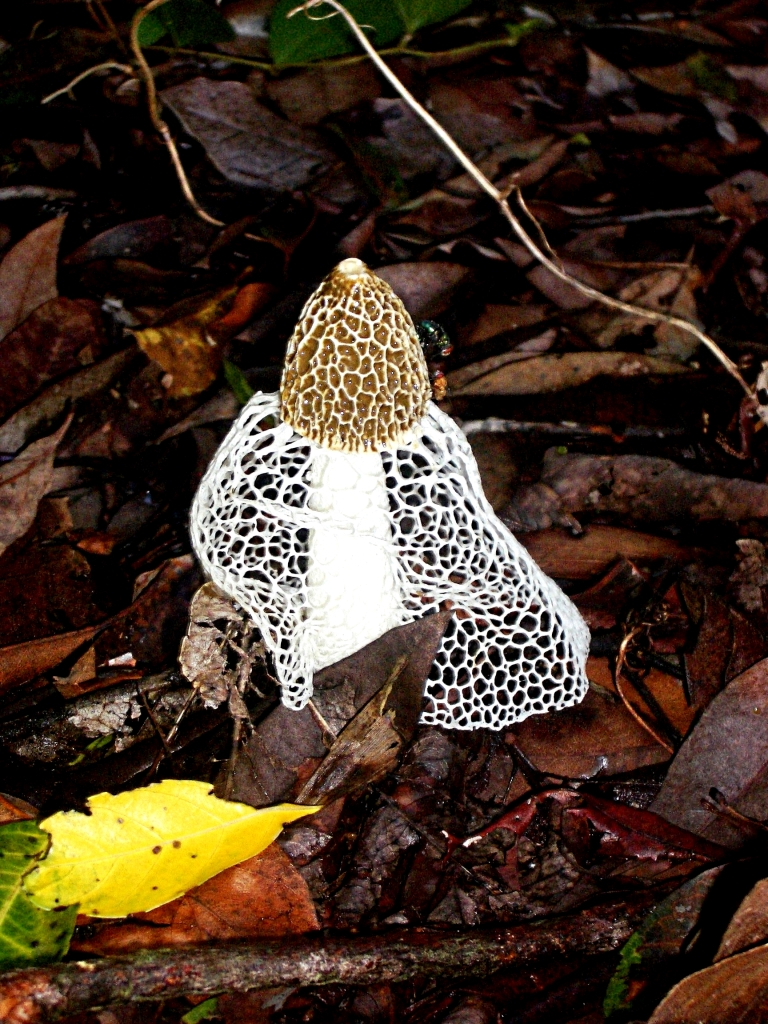
Phallus indusiatus found in Cooktown, Australia.

Immature fruit bodies of P. indusiatus are initially enclosed in an egg-shaped to roughly spherical subterranean structure encased in a peridium. The "egg" ranges from whitish to buff to reddish-brown, measures up to 6 centimetres (2 1/4 inches) in diameter, and usually has a thick mycelial cord attached at the bottom. As the mushroom matures, the pressure caused by the enlargement of the internal structures cause the peridium to tear and the fruit body rapidly emerges from the "egg". The mature mushroom is up to 25 cm (10 in) tall and girded with a net-like structure called the indusium (or less technically a "skirt") that hangs down from the conical to bell-shaped cap. The netlike openings of the indusium may be polygonal or round in shape. Well-developed specimens have an indusium that reaches to the volva and flares out somewhat before collapsing on the stalk.

The cap is 1.5–4 cm (1/2–1 1/2 in) wide and its reticulated (pitted and ridged) surface is covered with a layer of greenish-brown and foul-smelling slime, the gleba, which initially partially obscures the reticulations. The top of the cap has a small hole. The stalk is 7–25 cm (3–10 in) long, and 1.5–3 cm (1/2–1 1/4 in) thick. The hollow stalk is white, roughly equal in width throughout its length, sometimes curved, and spongy. The ruptured peridium remains as a loose volva at the base of the stalk. Fruit bodies develop during the night, The growth is very rapid. It can rise to a height of 12.5 cm (4.9 in) in a single hour between 7 and 8 am solar time and to a height of 21 cm (8.3 in) by 9 am and require 10–15 hours to fully develop after emerging from the peridium. They are short-lived, typically lasting no more than a few days. At that point the slime has usually been removed by insects, leaving the pale off-white, bare cap surface exposed. The spores are thin-walled, smooth, elliptical or slightly curved, hyaline (translucent), and measure 2–3 by 1–1.5 μm.

=== Similar species ===
Compared to Phallus indusiatus ...

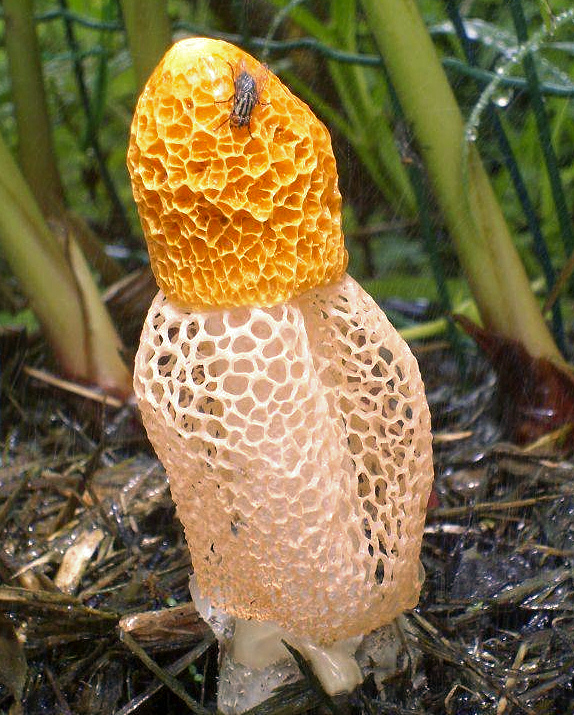
... P. multicolor is smaller and more brightly coloured

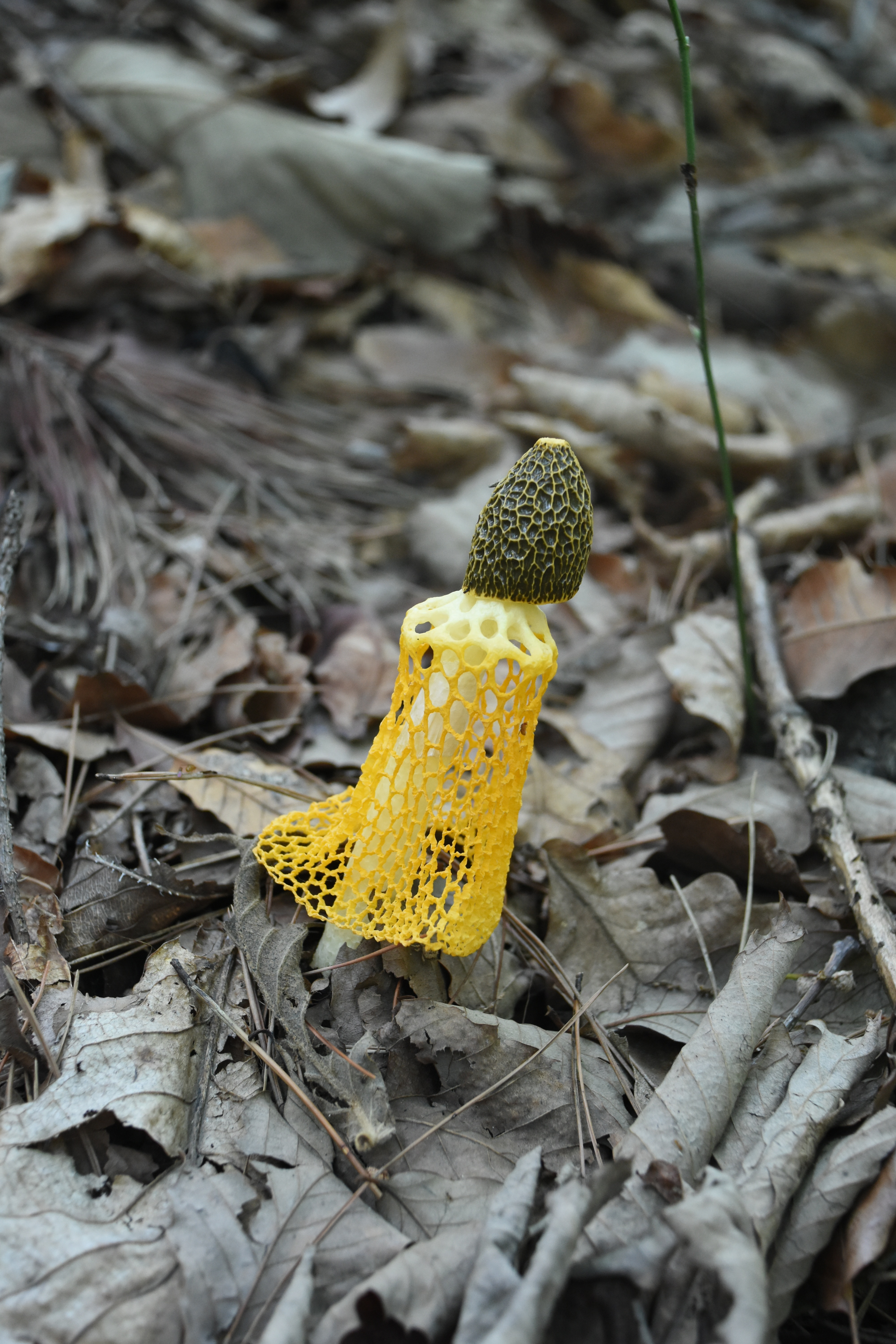
... P. luteus is bright yellow

Phallus multicolor is similar in overall appearance, but it has a more brightly coloured cap, stem and indusium, and it is usually smaller. It is found in Australia, Guam, Sumatra, Java, Borneo, Papua New Guinea, Zaire, and Tobago as well as Hawaii. The cap of the Indo-Pacific species P. merulinus appears smooth when covered with gleba, and is pale and wrinkled once the gleba has worn off. In contrast, the cap surface of P. indusiatus tends to have conspicuous reticulations that remain clearly visible under the gleba. Also, the indusium of P. merulinus is more delicate and shorter than that of P. indusiatus, and is thus less likely to collapse under its own weight. Common in eastern North America and Japan, and widely recorded in Europe, the species P. duplicatus has a smaller indusium that hangs 3–6 cm (1 1/4–2 1/4 in) from the bottom of the cap, and sometimes collapses against the stalk.

Found in Asia, Australia, Hawaii, southern Mexico, and Central and South America, P. cinnabarinus grows to 13 cm (5 in) tall, and has a more offensive odour than P. indusiatus. It attracts flies from the genus Lucilia (family Calliphoridae), rather than the house flies of the genus Musca that visit P. indusiatus. P. echinovolvatus, described from China in 1988, is closely related to P. indusiatus, but can be distinguished by its volva that has a spiky (echinulate) surface, and its higher preferred growth temperature of 30 to 35 °C (86 to 95 °F). P. luteus, originally considered a form of P. indusiatus, has a yellowish reticulate cap, a yellow indusium, and a pale pink to reddish-purple peridium and rhizomorphs. It is found in Asia and Mexico.

== Distribution ==
The range of Phallus indusiatus is tropical, including Africa (Congo, Nigeria, Uganda, and Zaire), South America (Brazil Guyana, and Venezuela), Central America (Costa Rica), and Tobago. In North America, its range is restricted to Mexico. Asian localities include Indonesia, Nepal, Malaysia, India, Southern China, Japan, and Taiwan. It has also been collected in Australia.

== Ecology ==
Like all Phallus species, P. indusiatus is saprobic—deriving nutrients from breaking down wood and plant organic matter. The fruit bodies grow singly or in groups in disturbed ground and among wood chips. In Asia, it grows among bamboo forests, and typically fruits after heavy rains. The method of reproduction for stinkhorns, including P. indusiatus, is different from most agaric mushrooms, which forcibly eject their spores. Stinkhorns instead produce a sticky spore mass that has a sharp, sickly-sweet odour of carrion. The cloying stink of mature fruit bodies—detectable from a considerable distance—is attractive to certain insects. Species recorded visiting the fungus include stingless bees of the genus Trigona, and flies of the families Drosophilidae and Muscidae. Insects assist in spore dispersal by consuming the gleba and depositing excrement containing intact spores to germinate elsewhere. Although the function of the indusium is not known definitively, it may visually entice insects not otherwise attracted by the odour, and serve as a ladder for crawling insects to reach the gleba.

== Uses ==
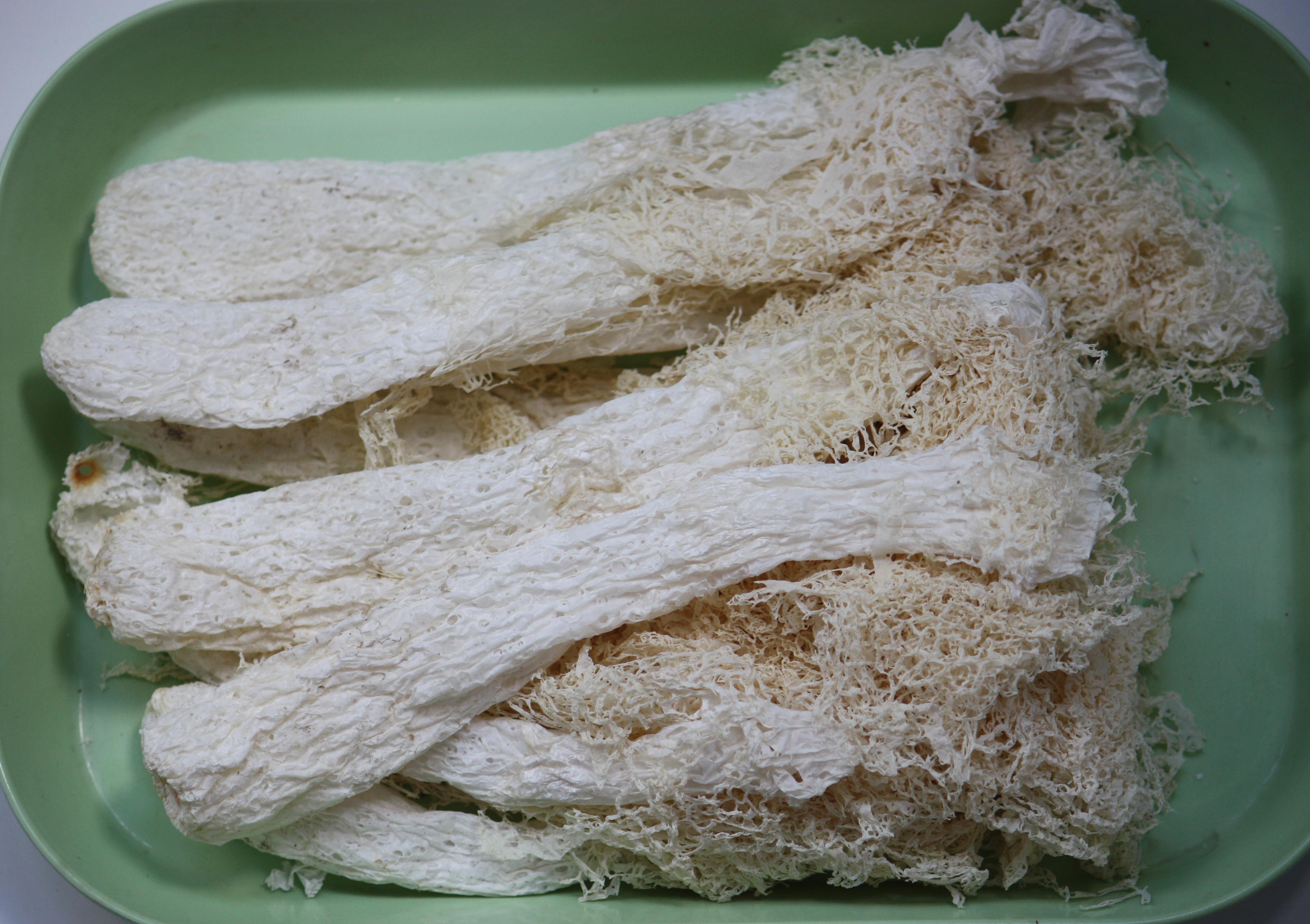
The fungus is sold dried and is usually rehydrated before cooking.

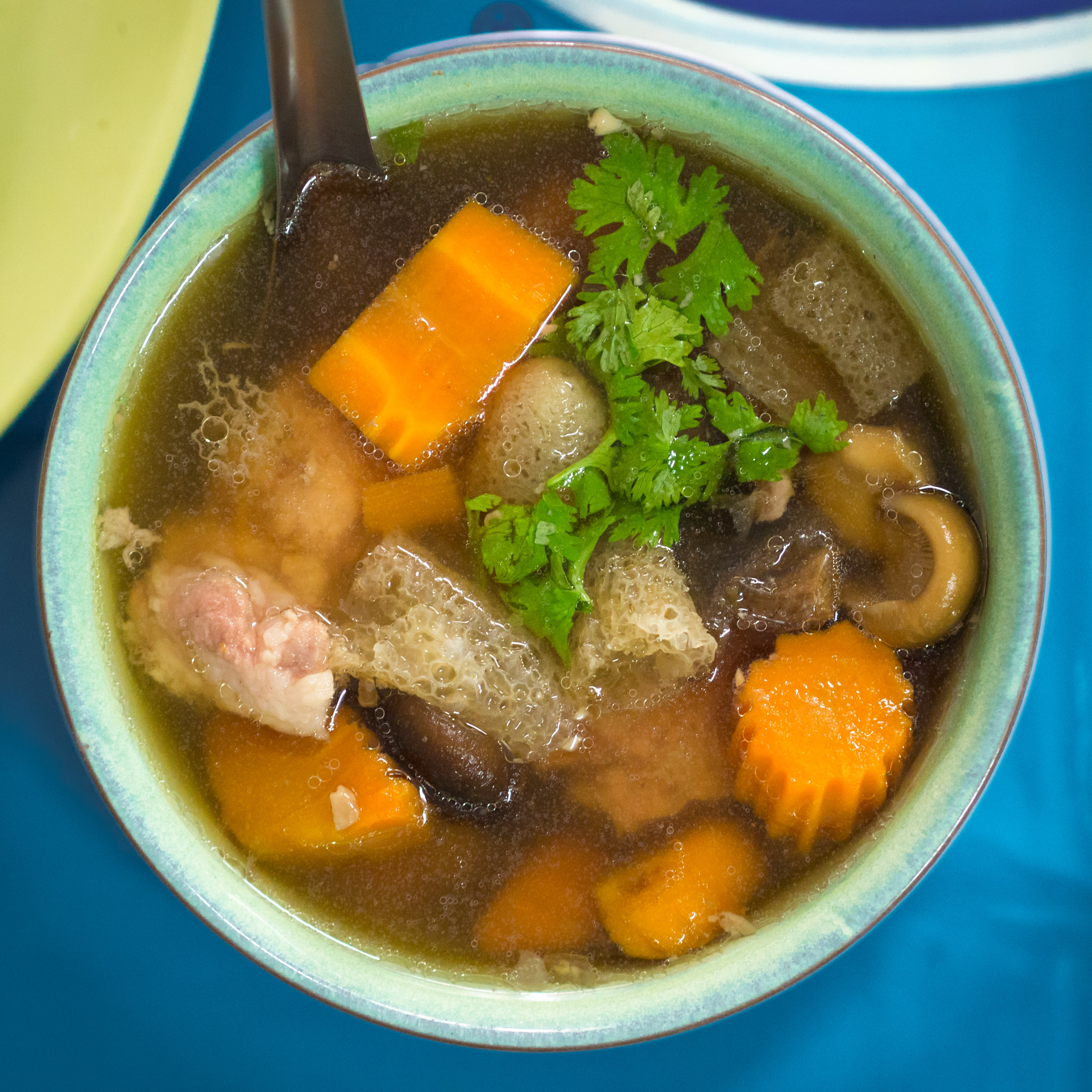
Tom yuea phai is a Thai soup made with this fungus.

=== Culinary ===
In eastern Asia, P. indusiatus is considered a delicacy and an aphrodisiac. Previously only collected in the wild, where it is not abundant, it was difficult to procure. The mushroom's scarcity meant that it was usually reserved for special occasions. In the time of China's Qing dynasty, the species was collected in Yunnan Province and sent to the Imperial Palaces to satisfy the appetite of Empress Dowager Cixi, who particularly enjoyed meals containing edible fungi. It was one of the eight featured ingredients of the "Bird's Nest Eight Immortals Soup" served at a banquet to celebrate her 60th birthday. This dish, served by descendants of the Confucius family in celebrations and longevity banquets, contained ingredients that were "all precious food, delicacies from land and sea, fresh, tender, and crisp, appropriately sweet and salty". Another notable use was a state banquet held for American diplomat Henry Kissinger on his visit to China to reestablish diplomatic relations in the early 1970s. One source writes of the mushroom: "It has a fine and tender texture, fragrance and is attractive, beautiful in shape, fresh and crispy in taste." The dried fungus, commonly sold in Asian markets, is prepared by rehydrating and soaking or simmering in water until tender. Sometimes used in stir-frys, it is traditionally used as a component of rich chicken soups. The rehydrated mushroom can also be stuffed and cooked.

Phallus indusiatus has been cultivated on a commercial scale in China since 1979. In the Fujian Province of China—known for a thriving mushroom industry that cultivates 45 species of edible fungi—P. indusiatus is produced in the counties of Fuan, Jianou, and Ningde. Advances in cultivation have made the fungus cheaper and more widely available; in 1998, about 1,100 metric tons (1,100 long tons; 1,200 short tons) were produced in China. The Hong Kong price for a kilogram of dried mushrooms reached around US $770 in 1982, but had dropped to US $100–200 by 1988. Additional advances led to it dropping further to US $10–20 by 2000. The fungus is grown on agricultural wastes—bamboo-trash sawdust covered with a thin layer of non-sterilised soil. The optimal temperature for the growth of mushroom spawn and fruit bodies is about 24 °C (75 °F), with a relative humidity of 90–95%. Other substrates that can be used for the cultivation of the fungus include bamboo leaves and small stems, soybean pods or stems, corn stems, and willow leaves.

=== Traditional medicine ===
Traditional medicine properties have been ascribed to Phallus indusiatus in a Chinese Tang dynasty pharmacopoeia. The fungus was used to allegedly treat inflammatory, stomach, and neural diseases. Southern China's Miao people continue to use it traditionally for a number of afflictions. It has been prescribed as Traditional Chinese Medicine as a treatment for laryngitis, leucorrhea, fever, and oliguria (low urine output), diarrhea, hypertension, cough, hyperlipidemia, and in anticancer therapy.

=== Research ===
The fruit bodies of the fungus contain biologically active polysaccharides. A β-D-glucan called T-5-N and prepared from alkaline extracts has been shown to have anti-inflammatory properties in rats. Its chemical structure is a linear chain backbone made largely of α-1→3 linked D-mannopyranosyl residues, with traces of 1→6 linked D-mannopyrosyl residues. The polysaccharide has tumour-suppressing activity against subcutaneously implanted sarcoma 180 (a transplantable, non-metastasizing connective tissue tumour often used in research) in mice.

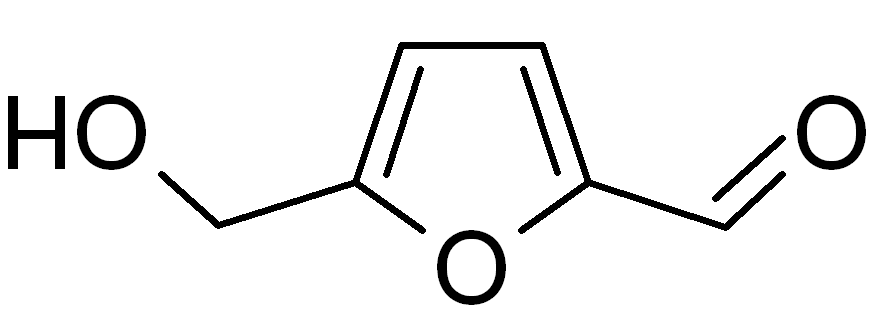
Hydroxymethylfurfural inhibits the enzyme tyrosinase.

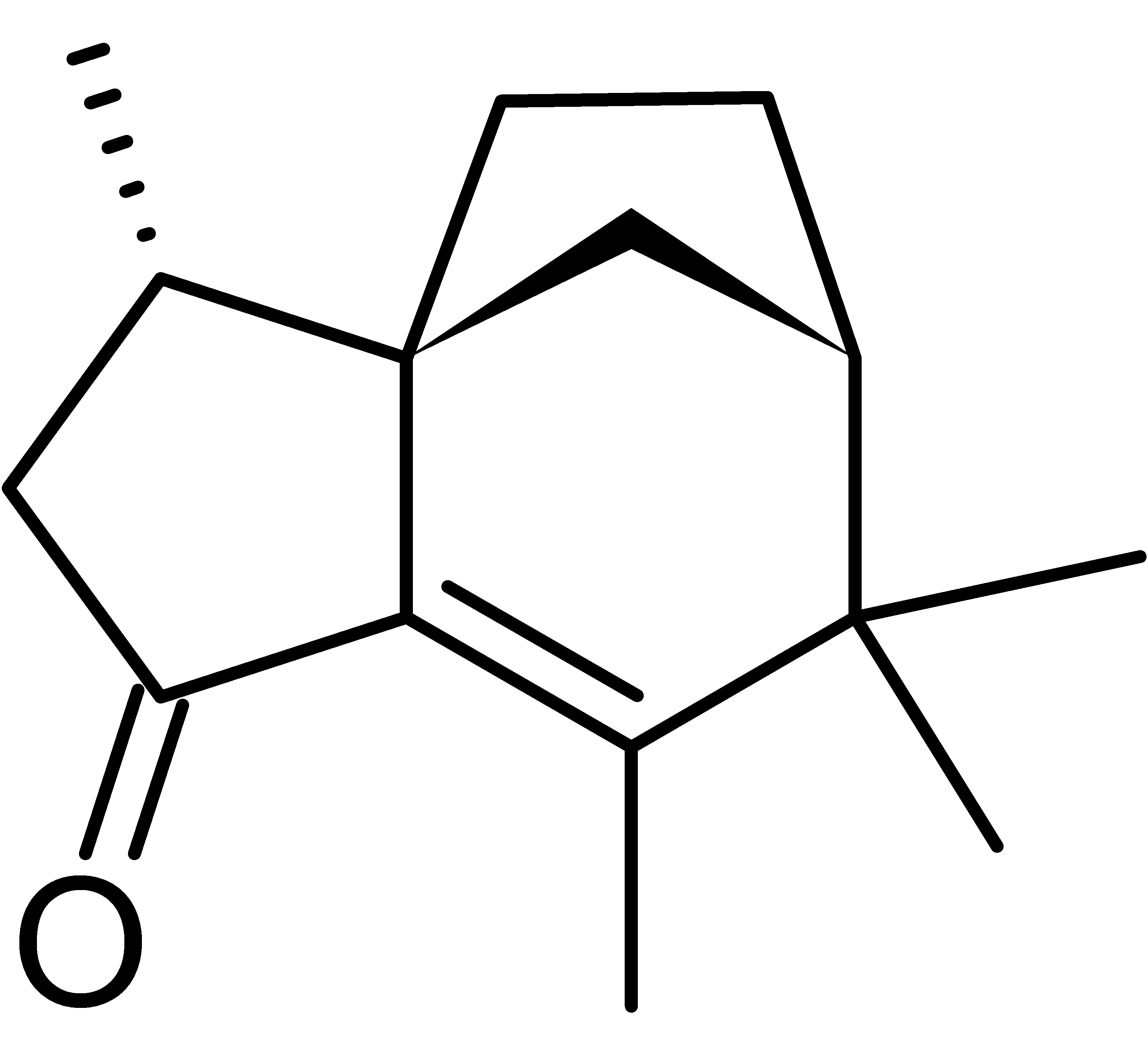
Albaflavenone has antibiotic properties.

Another chemical of interest found in P. indusiatus is hydroxymethylfurfural, which has attracted attention as a tyrosinase inhibitor. Tyrosinase catalyzes the initial steps of melanogenesis in mammals, and is responsible for the undesirable browning reactions in damaged fruits during post-harvest handling and processing, and its inhibitors are of interest to the medical, cosmetics, and food industries. Hydroxymethylfurfural, which occurs naturally in several foods, is not associated with serious health risks. P. indusiatus also contains a unique ribonuclease (an enzyme that cuts RNA into smaller components) possessing several biochemical characteristics that differentiate it from other known mushroom ribonucleases.

Two novel sesquiterpenes, dictyophorine A and B, have been identified from the fruit bodies of the fungus. These compounds, based on the eudesmane skeleton (a common structure found in plant-derived flavours and fragrances), are the first eudesmane derivatives isolated from fungi and were found to promote the synthesis of nerve growth factor in astroglial cells. Related compounds isolated and identified from the fungus include three quinazoline derivatives (a class of compounds rare in nature), dictyoquinazol A, B, and C. These chemicals were shown in laboratory tests to have a protective effect on cultured mouse neurons that had been exposed to neurotoxins. A total synthesis for the dictyoquinazols was reported in 2007.

The antibiotic albaflavenone was isolated from the mushroom in 2011. It is a sesquiterpenoid that was already known from the soil bacterium Streptomyces albidoflavus. Experiments have shown that extracts of P. indusiatus have antioxidant in addition to antimicrobial properties in chemical assays.

A 2001 publication in the International Journal of Medicinal Mushrooms attempted to determine its efficacy as an aphrodisiac. In the trial involving sixteen women, six self-reported the experience of a mild orgasm while smelling the fruit body, and the other ten, who received smaller doses, self-reported an increased heart rate. All of the twenty men tested considered the smell displeasing. The study used fruit bodies found in Hawaii, not the edible variety cultivated in China. The study has received criticism. A way to achieve instant orgasms would be expected to gain much attention and many attempts to reproduce the effect, but none has succeeded. No major science journal has published the study, and there are no studies where the results have been reproduced.

== In culture ==
According to ethnomycologist R. Gordon Wasson, P. indusiatus was consumed in Mexican divinatory ceremonies on account of its suggestive shape. On the other side of the globe, New Guinea natives consider the mushroom sacred. In Nigeria, the mushroom is one of several stinkhorns given the name Akufodewa by the Yoruba people. The name is derived from a combination of the Yoruba words ku ("die"), fun ("for"), ode ("hunter"), and wa ("search"), and refers to how the mushroom's stench can attract hunters who mistake its odour for that of a dead animal. The Yoruba have been reported to have used it as a component of a charm to make hunters less visible in times of danger. In other parts of Nigeria, they have been used in the preparation of harmful charms by ethnic groups such as the Urhobo and the Ibibio people. The Igbo people of east-central Nigeria called stinkhorns éró ḿma, from the Igbo words for "mushroom" and "beauty".
