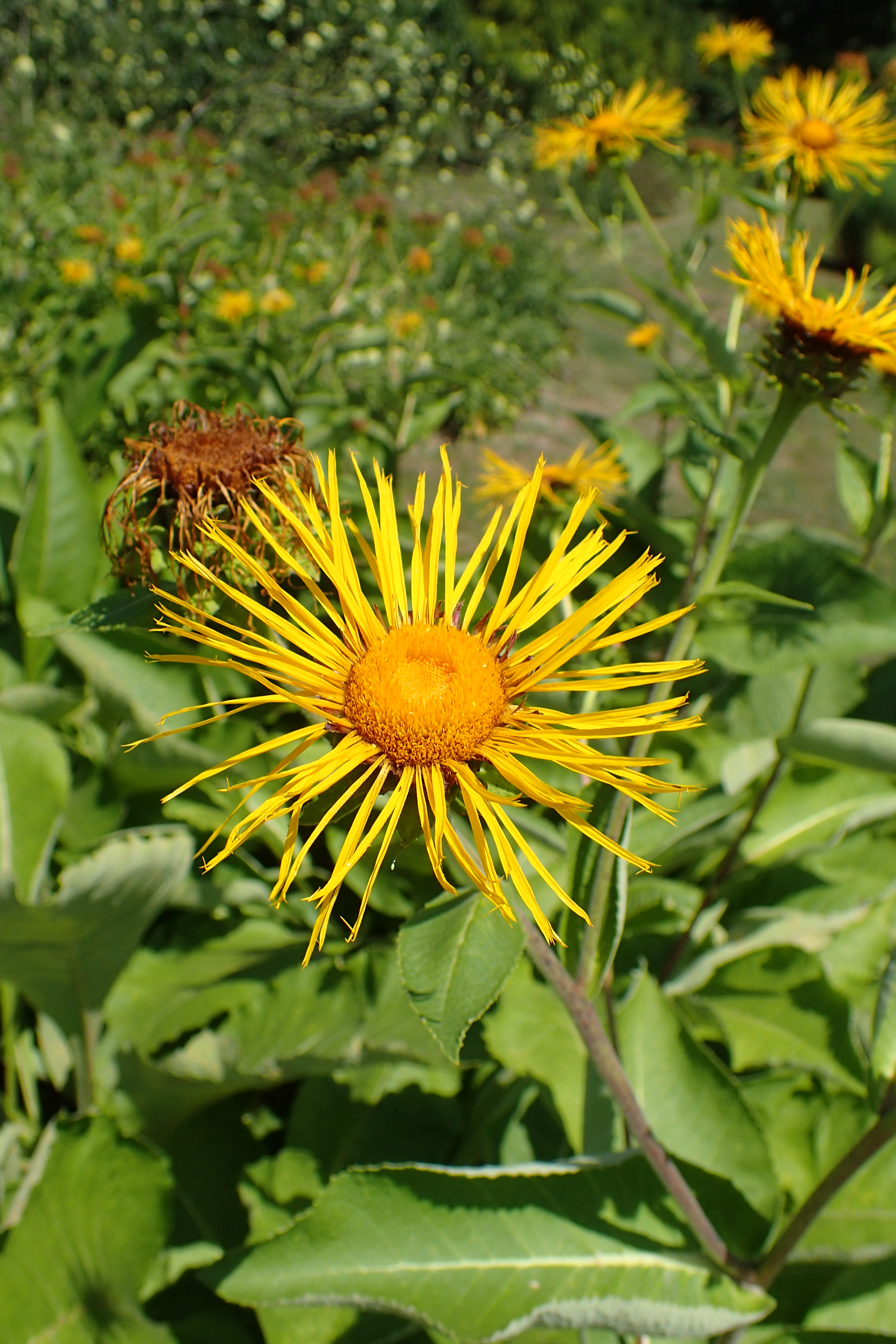

Scientific classification
- Kingdom: Plantae
- Clade: Tracheophytes
- Clade: Angiosperms
- Clade: Eudicots
- Clade: Asterids
- Order: Asterales
- Family: Asteraceae
- Genus: Inula
- Species: I. royleana

Binomial name
- Inula royleana DC.

Synonyms
- Corvisartia indica Lindl.; Helenium royleanum Kuntze; Inula stoliczkae C.B.Clarke

= Inula royleana =

Species of flowering plant

Inula royleana is a species of plant in the daisy family Asteraceae. It is native to Pakistan and the western Himalayas.
