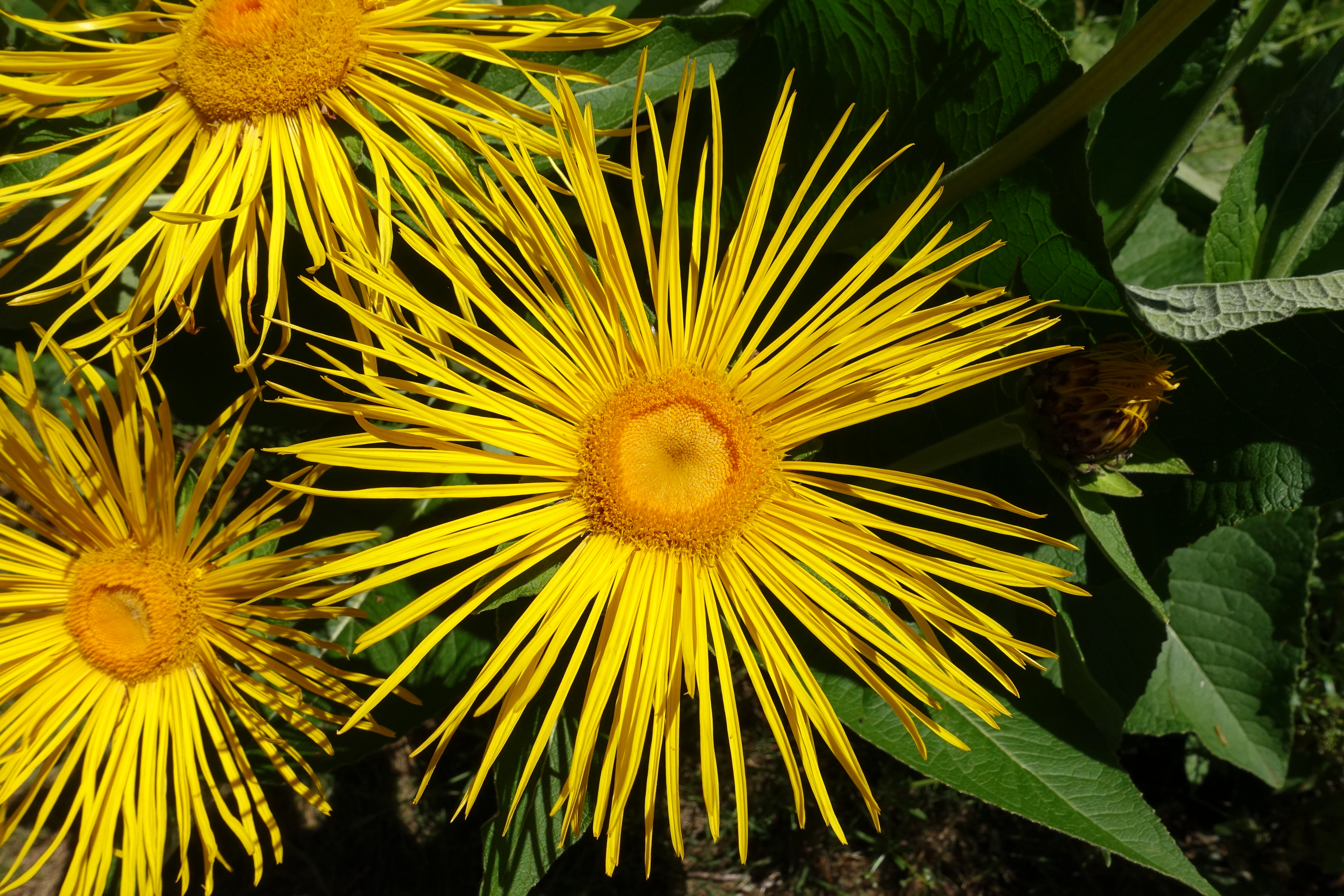

Scientific classification
- Kingdom: Plantae
- Clade: Tracheophytes
- Clade: Angiosperms
- Clade: Eudicots
- Clade: Asterids
- Order: Asterales
- Family: Asteraceae
- Genus: Inula
- Species: I. magnifica

Binomial name
- Inula magnifica Lipsky 1897

= Inula magnifica =

Species of flowering plant

Inula magnifica, the giant fleabane, is a species of flowering plant in the sunflower family Asteraceae, native to the eastern Caucasus. It is a tall herbaceous perennial growing to 1.8 m (6 ft) tall by 1 m (3 ft) broad, with hairy stems and leaves. In late summer it bears rich yellow, daisy-like composite flower-heads 15 cm (6 in) in diameter, with narrowly tubular ray florets. It is suitable for planting at the back of a border, or in a wild meadow or prairie-style garden.

The cultivar 'Sonnenstrahl' has gained the Royal Horticultural Society's Award of Garden Merit.

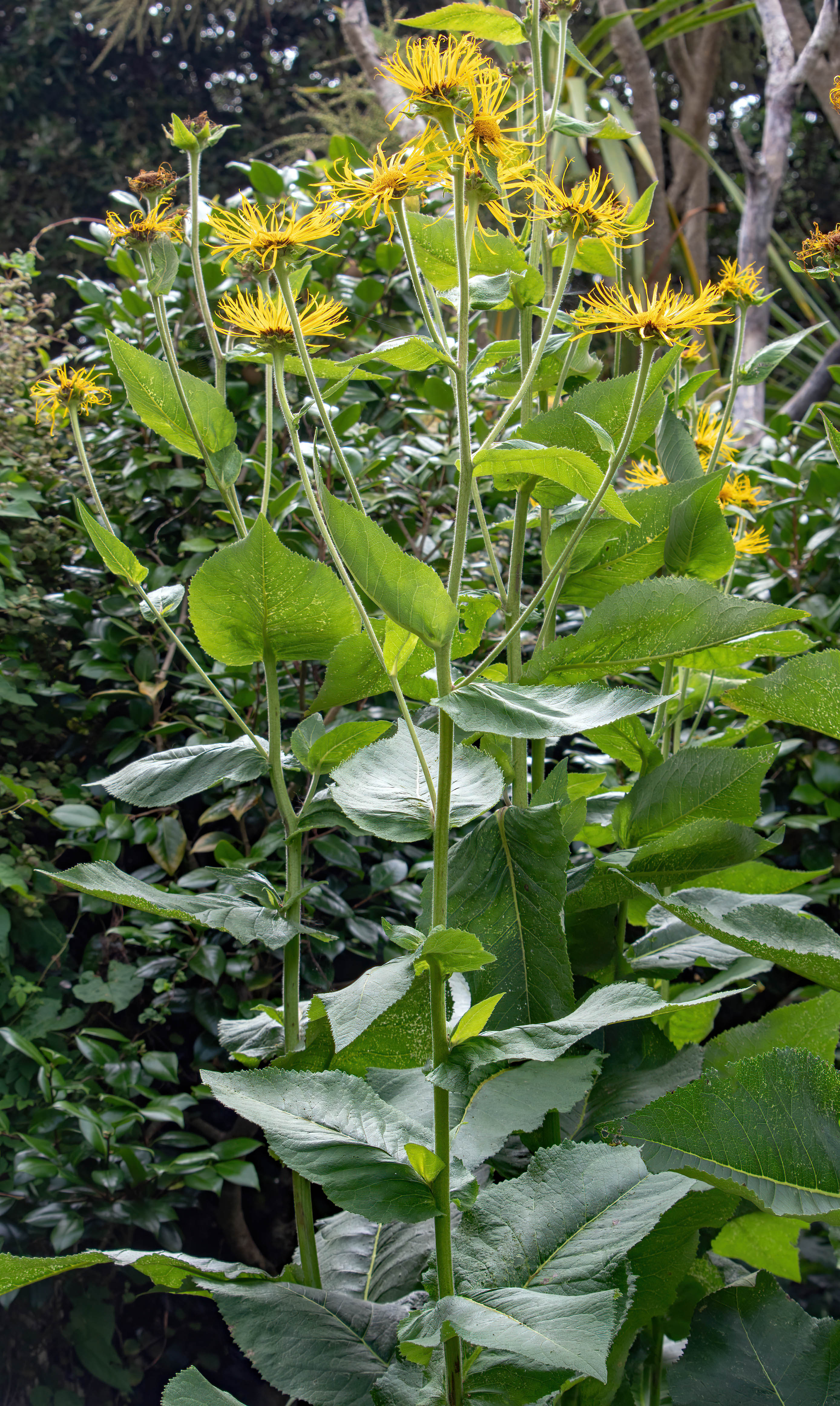
Inula magnifica, Cornwall England.
