= Helenin =

- Alantolactone

- Isoalantolactone

Names
- IUPAC names Alantolactone: (3aR,5S,8aR,9aR)-5,8a-Dimethyl-3-methylene-3a,5,6,7,8,8a,9,9a-octahydronaphtho[2,3-b]furan-2(3H)-one; Isoalantolactone: (3aR,4aS,8aR,9aR)-8a-Methyl-3,5-bis(methylene)decahydronaphtho[2,3-b]furan-2(3H)-one
- Other names Elecampane camphor, Inula camphor, Alant camphor

Identifiers
| CAS Number | Alantolactone: 546-43-0; isolantolactone: 470-17-7 |
| 3D model (JSmol) | Alantolactone: Interactive image; isolantolactone: Interactive image |
| ChEBI | Alantolactone: CHEBI:2540; isolantolactone: CHEBI:5981 |
| ChEMBL | Alantolactone: ChEMBL136356; isolantolactone: ChEMBL137803 |
| ChemSpider | Alantolactone: 65564; isolantolactone: 66028 |
| EC Number | Alantolactone: 208-899-3 |
| KEGG | Alantolactone: C09289; isolantolactone: C09484 |
| PubChem CID | Alantolactone: 72724; isolantolactone: 73285 |
| UNII | Alantolactone: M7GSN5Q1M6; isolantolactone: BYH07P620U |
- InChI: InChI=1S/C15H20O2/c1-9-5-4-6-15(3)8-13-11(7-12(9)15)10(2)14(16)17-13/h7,9,11,13H,2,4-6,8H2,1,3H3/t9-,11+,13+,15+/m0/s1 Key: PXOYOCNNSUAQNS-AGNJHWRGSA-N; isolantolactone: InChI=1S/C15H20O2/c1-9-5-4-6-15(3)8-13-11(7-12(9)15)10(2)14(16)17-13/h11-13H,1-2,4-8H2,3H3/t11-,12+,13-,15-/m1/s1 Key: CVUANYCQTOGILD-QVHKTLOISA-N
- SMILES: Alantolactone: C[C@H]1CCC[C@]2(C1=C[C@H]3[C@@H](C2)OC(=O)C3=C)C; isolantolactone: C[C@]12CCCC(=C)[C@@H]1C[C@H]3[C@@H](C2)OC(=O)C3=C

Properties
| Chemical formula | C_{15}H_{20}O_{2} |
| Molar mass | 232.323 g·mol^{−1} |
| Appearance | Crystalline powder |
- Except where otherwise noted, data are given for materials in their standard state (at 25 °C [77 °F], 100 kPa). Infobox references

Helenin is a phytochemical mixture found in many plant species, including the Inula helenium (elecampane) of the family Asteraceae. It is a mixture of two isomeric sesquiterpene lactones, alantolactone and isoalantolactone.

In 1895 the German scientists Julius Bredt and Wilhelm Posh extracted helenin from Inula helenium and determined its physical and chemical properties.

== Natural sources ==
Alantolactone occurs in the roots of Inula helenium and other Inula species. Helenin discovered in Stevia lucida for the first time, showcasing potential links within the Asteraceae family.

== Properties ==
Helenin can be extracted from the roots of Inula helenium using alcohol or other non-polar solvents to produce a mixture with a composition of about 40% alantolactone and 60% isoalantolactone.

== Biological activity ==
Alantolactone has a variety of in vitro biochemical properties, including:

- induces apoptosis and cell cycle arrest in lung squamous cancer cells
- suppresses STAT3 activation
- has antiinflammatory effects by inhibiting chemokine production and STAT1 phosphorylation
- anti-fungal
- anti-microbial

== Toxicity ==
Certain individuals have experienced contact dermatitis when exposed to alantolactone.
