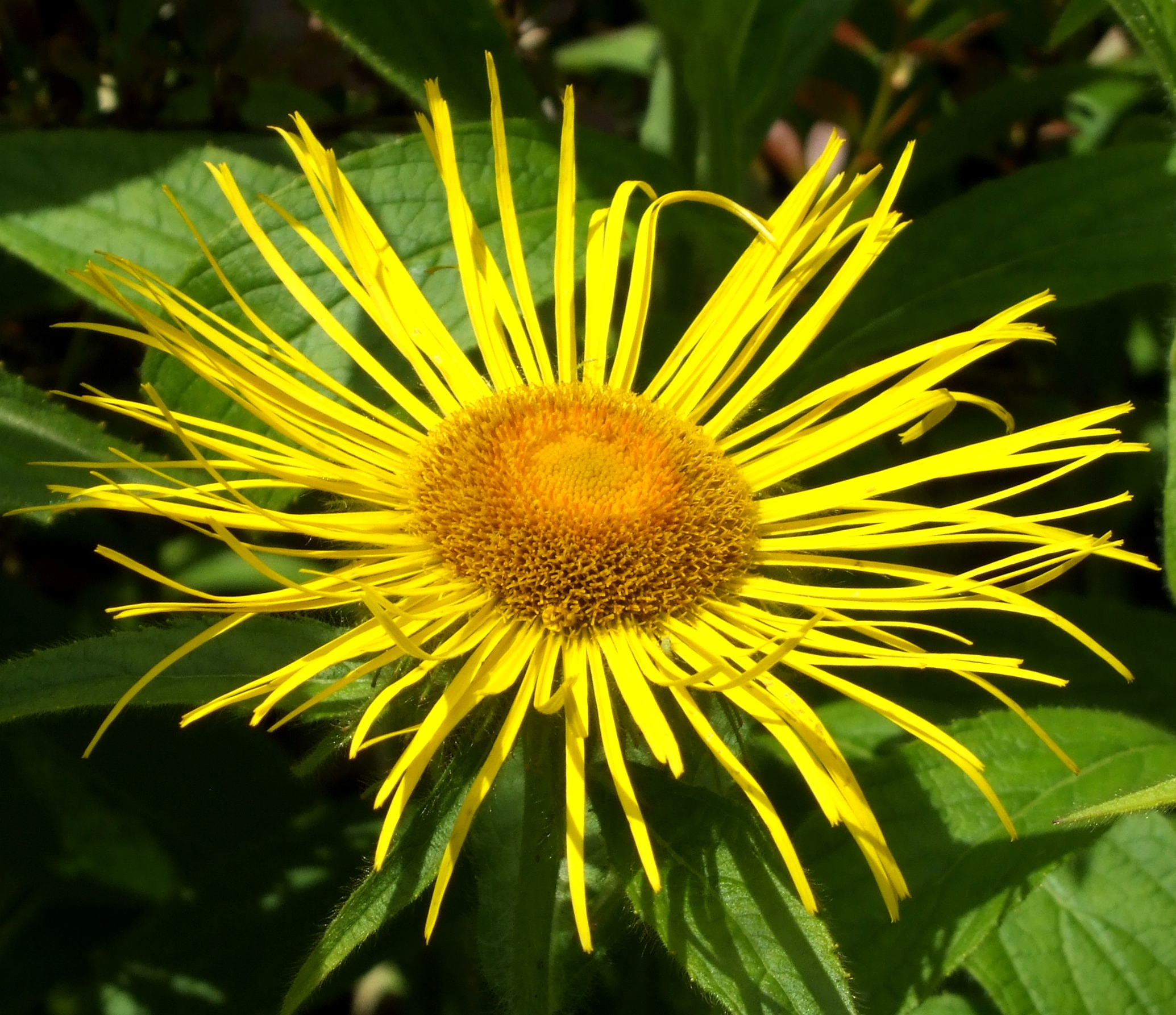

Scientific classification
- Kingdom: Plantae
- Clade: Tracheophytes
- Clade: Angiosperms
- Clade: Eudicots
- Clade: Asterids
- Order: Asterales
- Family: Asteraceae
- Genus: Inula
- Species: I. hookeri

Binomial name
- Inula hookeri C.B.Clarke

= Inula hookeri =

Species of flowering plant

Inula hookeri, Hooker's inula or Hooker's fleabane, is a species of flowering plant in the sunflower and daisy family Asteraceae. It is native to the Himalayas (Bhutan and Nepal), India (Sikkim), Myanmar and China (SE Xizang, NW Yunnan), where it grows in a variety of open habitats at 2,400–3,600 m (7,900–11,800 ft).

The specific epithet hookeri commemorates the plant hunter Sir Joseph Hooker, who brought it back from the Himalayas to Britain in 1849.

== Description ==
This herbaceous perennial is a tall stemmed plant growing to 75 cm (30 in), with 2 or 3 flower heads per plant. The flowers, which may be up to 8 cm (3.1 in) in diameter, appear in late summer and autumn. Each inflorescence comprises a disc of many needle-like yellow ray florets surrounding a raised central boss of deeper yellow disc florets.
