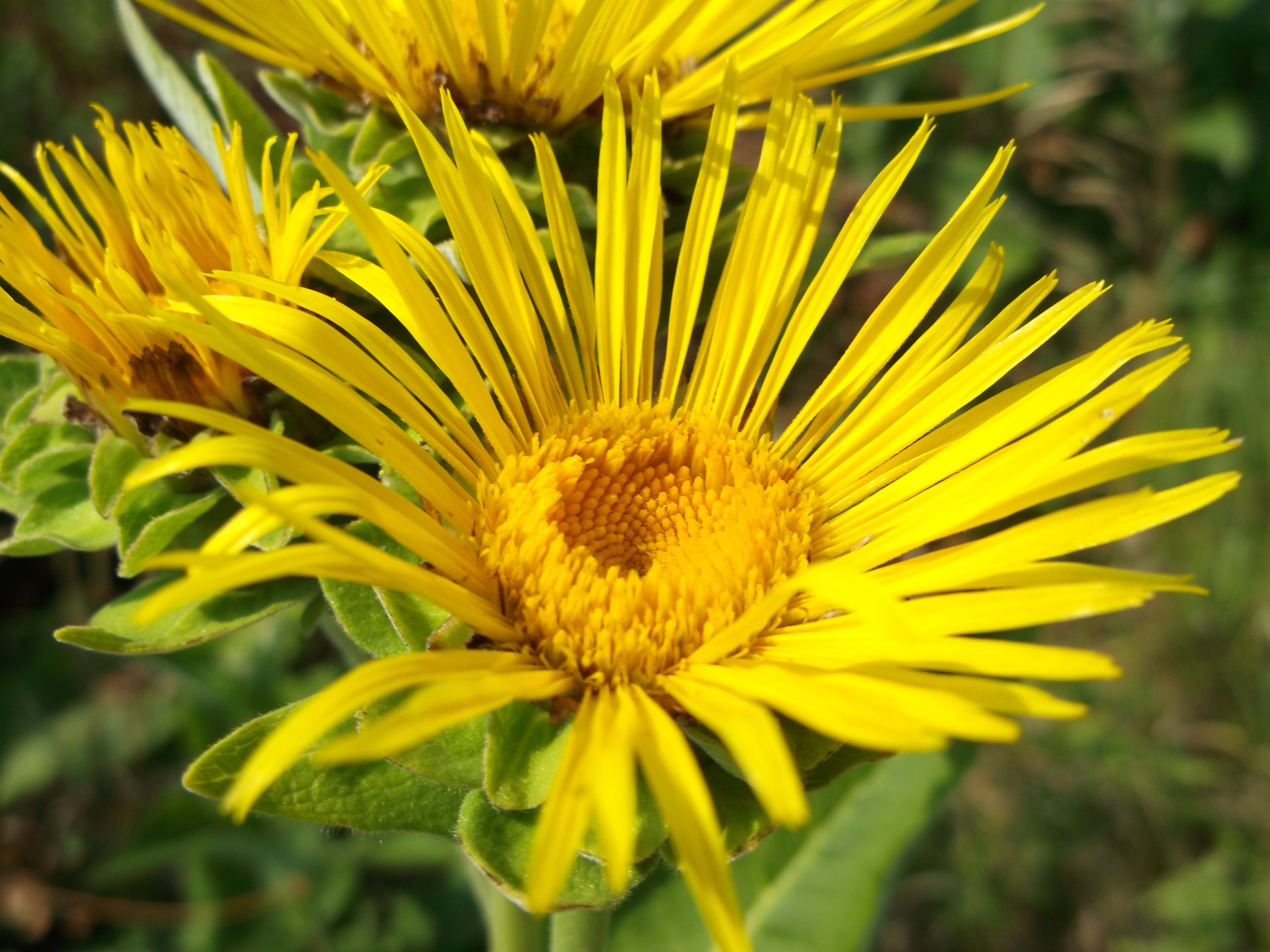
- Elecampane (Inula helenium) flower, photographed in Ottawa, Ontario, in 2019

Scientific classification
- Kingdom: Plantae
- Clade: Tracheophytes
- Clade: Angiosperms
- Clade: Eudicots
- Clade: Asterids
- Order: Asterales
- Family: Asteraceae
- Genus: Inula
- Species: I. helenium

Binomial name
- Inula helenium L.

Synonyms
- Aster helenium (L.) Scop.; Aster officinalis All.; Corvisartia helenium (L.) Mérat; Helenium grandiflorum Gilib.; Inula orgyalis Boiss.

= Elecampane =

Species of flowering plant in the daisy family

Elecampane (Inula helenium), pronounced /ˌɛlɪkæmˈpeɪn/ and also called horse-heal or elfdock, is a widespread plant species in the sunflower family Asteraceae. It is native to Eurasia from Spain to Xinjiang province in western China, and naturalized in parts of North America.

== Description ==
Elecampane is a rather rigid herb, the stem of which attains a height of about 90–150 cm (35–59 in). The leaves are large and toothed, the lower ones stalked, the rest embracing the stem; blades egg-shaped, elliptical, or lance-shaped, as big as 30 cm (12 in) long and 12 cm (4.7 in) wide. Leaves are green on the upper side with light, scattered hairs, but whitish on the underside because of a thick layer of wool. The flower heads up to 5 cm (2 inches) broad, each head containing 50-100 yellow ray flowers and 100-250 yellow disc flowers. The root is thick, branching and mucilaginous, and has a bitter taste and a camphoraceous odour with sweet floral (similar to violet) undertones.

== Folklore ==
The plant's specific name, helenium, derives from Helen of Troy; elecampane is said to have sprung up from where her tears fell. It was sacred to the ancient Celts, and once had the name "elfwort". The plant traditionally was held to be associated with the elves and fairy folk.

Corrupted variations of the name Elecampane, such as alicompagne, hallecumb pain, and jollup and plain, have been used as miracle cures that can revive the dead in Mummers' play in Britain and Ireland.

The 17th-century herbalist Nicholas Culpeper considered elecampane to be ruled by Mercury and used it to warm a cold and windy stomach, to resist poison, to strengthen sight, and to clear internal blockages.

== Uses ==
The herb has been used since Ancient Greek times. Theophrastus recommended using the plant in oil and wine to treat the bites of vipers, spiders and pine caterpillars in his Historia Plantarum.

In Roman times, Apicius, a cookbook from the 1st century AD, describes it as a plant for testing whether honey is spoilt or not, the plant is immersed in the honey and then lit, if it burns brightly the honey is considered fine. The root was mentioned by Pliny in his Natural History both as a medicine and as a condiment.

In Medieval Europe, the roots were candied and eaten as confectionery.

In France and Switzerland it has been used in the manufacture of absinthe. In England it was formerly in great repute as an aromatic tonic and stimulant of the secretory organs. It is mentioned in an 1817 New-England almanack as a cure for hydrophobia when the root is bruised and used with a strong decoction of milk. It is used in herbal medicine as an expectorant and for water retention.

== Chemical constituents ==
Besides the storage polysaccharide inulin (C_{6}H_{12}O_{6}[C_{6}H_{10}O_{5}]_{n}), a polymer of fructose, the root contains helenin (C_{15}H_{20}O_{2}), a phytochemical compound consisting of alantolactone and isoalantolactone. Helenin is a stearoptene, which may be prepared in white acicular crystals, insoluble in water, but freely soluble in alcohol. When freed from the accompanying inula-camphor by repeated crystallization from alcohol, helenin melts at 110 °C.
