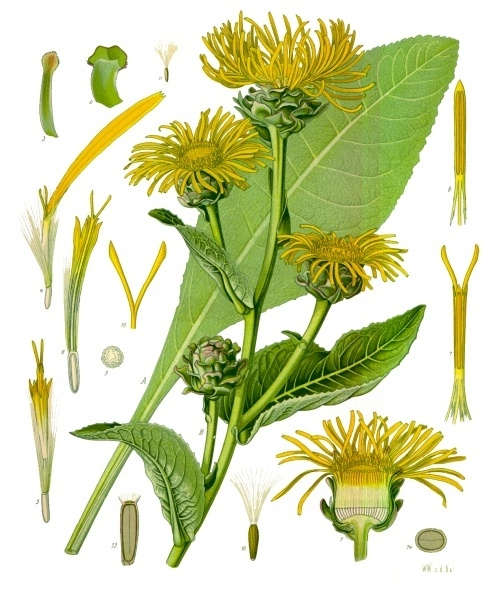
- Inula helenium

Scientific classification
- Kingdom: Plantae
- Clade: Embryophytes
- Clade: Tracheophytes
- Clade: Angiosperms
- Clade: Eudicots
- Clade: Asterids
- Order: Asterales
- Family: Asteraceae
- Subfamily: Asteroideae
- Tribe: Inuleae
- Genus: Inula; L.

Synonyms
- Bojeria DC.; Codonocephalum Fenzl; Corvisartia Mérat; Cupularia Godr. & Gren.; Orsina Bertol.; Eritheis Gray; Petrollinia Chiov.; Sprunnera Sch.Bip.

= Inula =

Genus of flowering plants in the daisy family

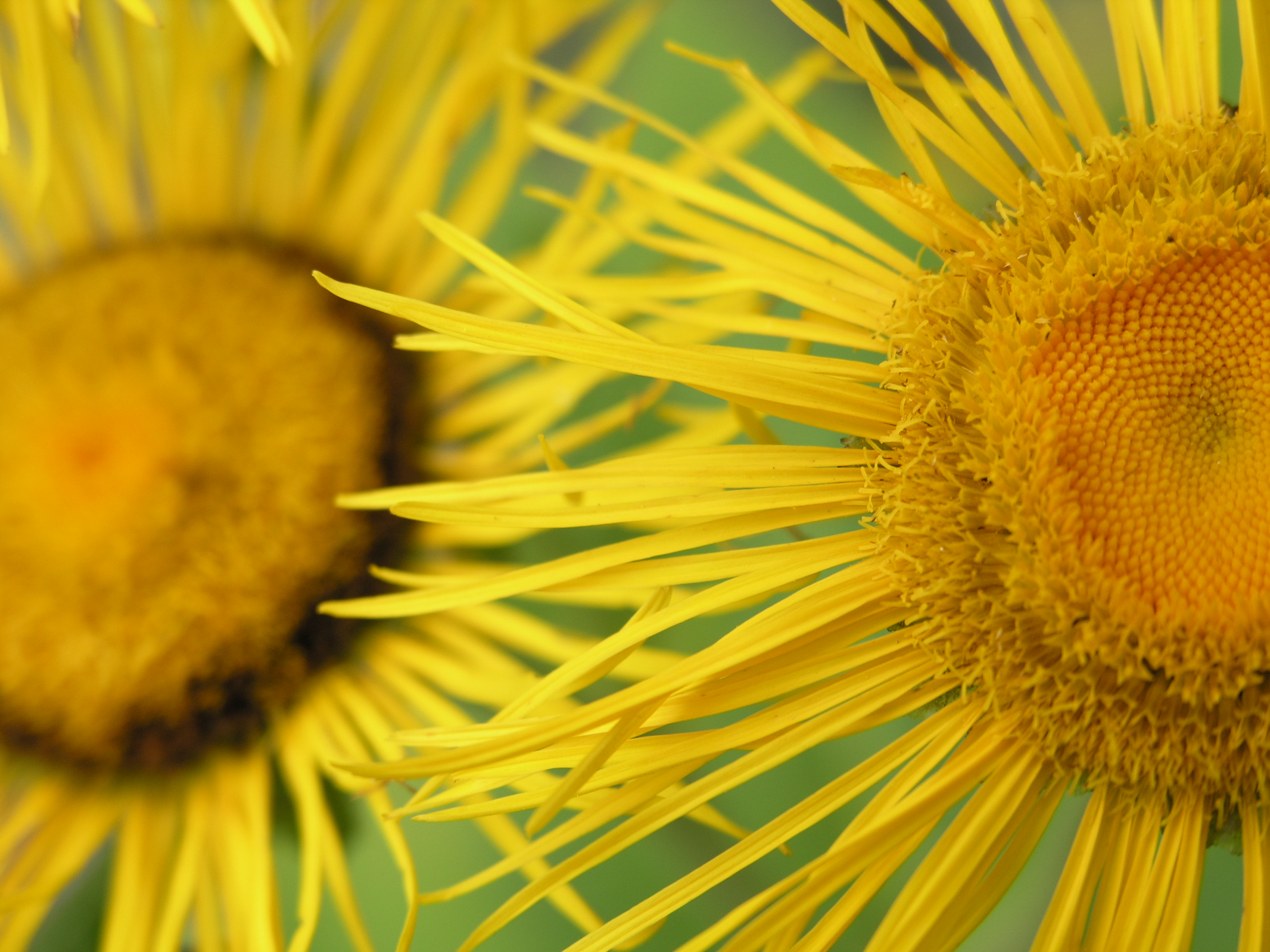
Inula helenium

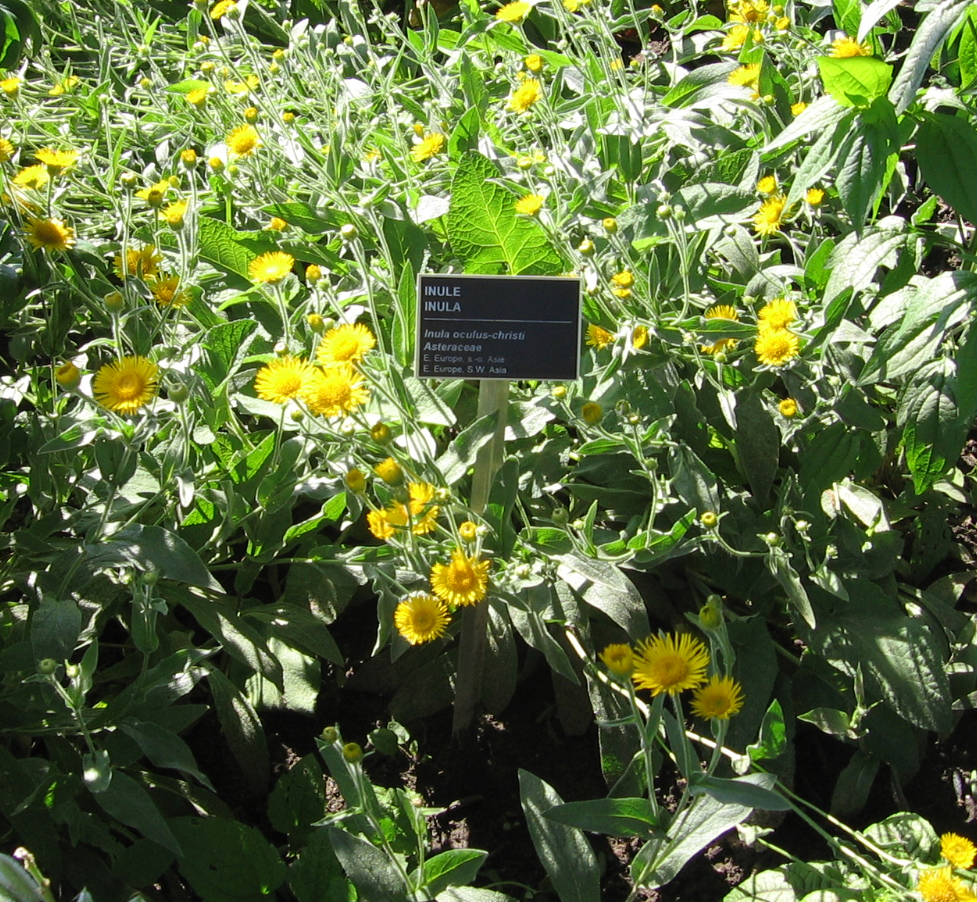
Inula oculus-christi

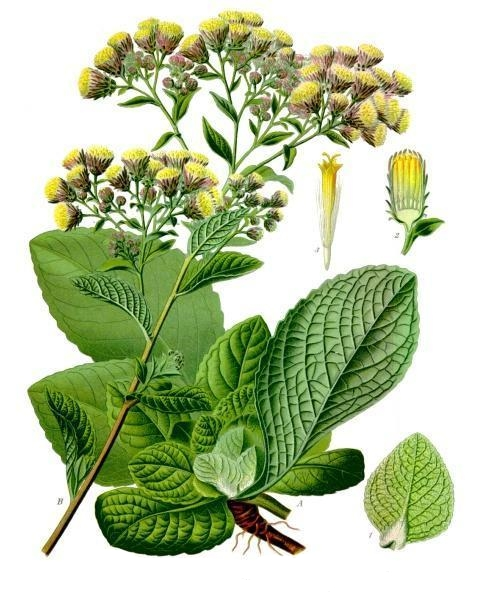
Ploughman's-spikenard (Inula conyzae)

Inula is a genus of about 80 species of flowering plants in the family Asteraceae, native to Europe, Asia and Africa.

They may be annuals, herbaceous perennials or subshrubs that vary greatly in size, from small species a few centimeters tall to enormous perennials over 3 m (10 ft) tall. They carry yellow daisy-like composite flowerheads often with narrow ray-florets.

Some common characteristics include pappus with bristles, flat capitulum, and lack of chaff.

Several species are popular flowers for the garden, with cultivation going back to antiquity. The smaller species are used in rock gardens and the more common larger ones, which tend to have very coarse foliage, in borders.

== Etymology ==
The genus name Inula is of uncertain origin, and was already in use by the Romans. The Latin phrase inula campana (field inula) gave rise to the English elecampane whose scientific name is Inula helenium. The plant's specific name, helenium, derives from Helen of Troy; elecampane is said to have sprung up from where her tears fell.

== Species ==
The following species are recognised in the genus Inula:

- Inula acaulis Schott & Kotschy ex Boiss. – stemless inula
- Inula acuminata DC.
- Inula anatolica Boiss.
- Inula angustifolia DC.
- Inula arbuscula Delile
- Inula aucheriana DC.
- Inula barbata Wall. ex DC.
- Inula candida (L.) Cass.
- Inula ciliaris Matsum.
- Inula clarkei (Hook.f.) R.R.Stewart
- Inula cuanzensis Hiern
- Inula decurrens Popov
- Inula discoidea Boiss.
- Inula eminii (O.Hoffm.) O.Hoffm.
- Inula engleriana O.Hoffm.
- Inula fragilis Boiss. & Hausskn.
- Inula gimbundensis S.Moore
- Inula glareosa E.M.Antipova
- Inula glauca C.Winkl.
- Inula glomerata C.Winkl.
- Inula gombczewskyi E.M.Antipova
- Inula gossweileri S.Moore
- Inula grandiflora Willd.
- Inula grandis Schrenk ex Fisch. & C. A. Mey.
- Inula helenium L. – elecampane
- Inula helianthus-aquatica C.Y.Wu ex Y.Ling
- Inula hendersoniae S.Moore
- Inula hissarica R.Nabiev
- Inula hookeri C.B.Clarke
- Inula huillensis Hiern
- Inula hupehensis (Y.Ling) Y.Ling
- Inula inuloides (Fenzl) Grierson
- Inula japonica Thunb.
- Inula kalapani C.B.Clarke
- Inula klingii O.Hoffm.
- Inula koelzii R.Dawar & Qaiser
- Inula limosa O.Hoffm.
- Inula linariifolia Turcz.
- Inula macrocephala Boiss. & Kotschy
- Inula macrolepis Bunge
- Inula magnifica Lipsky
- Inula mannii (Hook.f.) Oliv. & Hiern
- Inula mildbraedii Muschl.
- Inula montbretiana DC.
- Inula multicaulis Fisch. & C.A.Mey.
- Inula obtusifolia A.Kern.
- Inula oligocephala S.Moore
- Inula paludosa O.Hoffm.
- Inula peacockiana (Aitch. & Hemsl.) Korovin
- Inula perrieri (Humbert) Mattf.
- Inula persica F.Ghahrem. & Narimisa
- Inula poggeana O.Hoffm.
- Inula racemosa Hook.f.
- Inula rajamandii Narimisa & F.Ghahrem.
- Inula rhizocephala Schrenk ex Fisch. & C.A.Mey.
- Inula rhizocephaliformis Kamelin & Turak.
- Inula robynsii De Wild.
- Inula royleana DC.
- Inula salsoloides (Turcz.) Ostenf.
- Inula sarana Boiss.
- Inula schischkinii Gorschk.
- Inula schmalhausenii C.Winkl.
- Inula sechmenii Hartvig & Strid
- Inula sericeo-villosa Rech.f.
- Inula sericophylla Franch.
- Inula serratuloides (Gilli) Grierson
- Inula speciosa O.Hoffm.
- Inula stenocalathia (Rech.f.) Soldano
- Inula stewartii Abid & Qaiser
- Inula stolzii Mattf.
- Inula × stricta Tausch
- Inula subfloccosa Rech.f.
- Inula taiwanensis S.S.Ying
- Inula thapsoides (Spreng.) Spreng.
- Inula tuzgoluensis M.Öztürk & Ö.Çetin
- Inula urumoffii Degen
- Inula vernonioides O.Hoffm.
- Inula viscidula Boiss. & Kotschy
- Inula welwitschii O.Hoffm.

=== Select species formerly in Inula ===
- Inula auriculata Boiss. & Balansa => Pentanema auriculatum (Boiss. & Balansa) D.Gut.Larr. et al.
- Inula britannica L. => Pentanema britannica (L.) D.Gut.Larr.et al. – British yellowhead
- Inula conyzae (Griess.) Meikle => Pentanema squarrosum (L.) D.Gut.Larr.et al. – ploughman's-spikenard
- Inula crithmoides L. => Limbarda crithmoides (L.) Dumort. – golden samphire
- Inula dysenterica L. => Pulicaria dysenterica (L.) Bernh.
- Inula graminifolia Michx. => Pityopsis graminifolia (Michx.) Nutt.
- Inula graveolens (L.) Desf. => Dittrichia graveolens (L.) Greuter – stinkwort, stinkweed
- Inula hirta L. => Pentanema hirtum (L.) D.Gut.Larr. et al.
- Inula indica L. => Pentanema indicum (L.) Y.Ling
- Inula mariana L. => Chrysopsis mariana (L.) Elliott
- Inula orientalis Lam. => Pentanema orientale (Lam.) D.Gut.Larr.et al.
- Inula primulifolia Lam. => Conyza primulifolia (Lam.) Cuatrec. & Lourteig
- Inula salicina L. => Pentanema salicinum (L.) D.Gut.Larr.et al. – Irish fleabane, willowleaf yellowhead
- Inula spiraeifolia L. => Pentanema spiraeifolium (L.) D.Gut.Larr.et al.
- Inula subaxillaris Lam. => Heterotheca subaxillaris (Lam.) Britton & Rusby
- Inula viscosa => Dittrichia viscosa – false yellowhead, sticky fleabane, woody fleabane

== Ecology ==
Inula species are used as food plants by the larvae of some Lepidoptera species including case-bearers of the genus Coleophora, such as C. conyzae (recorded on I. conyzae), C. follicularis, C. inulae, and C. troglodytella.

== Gallery ==
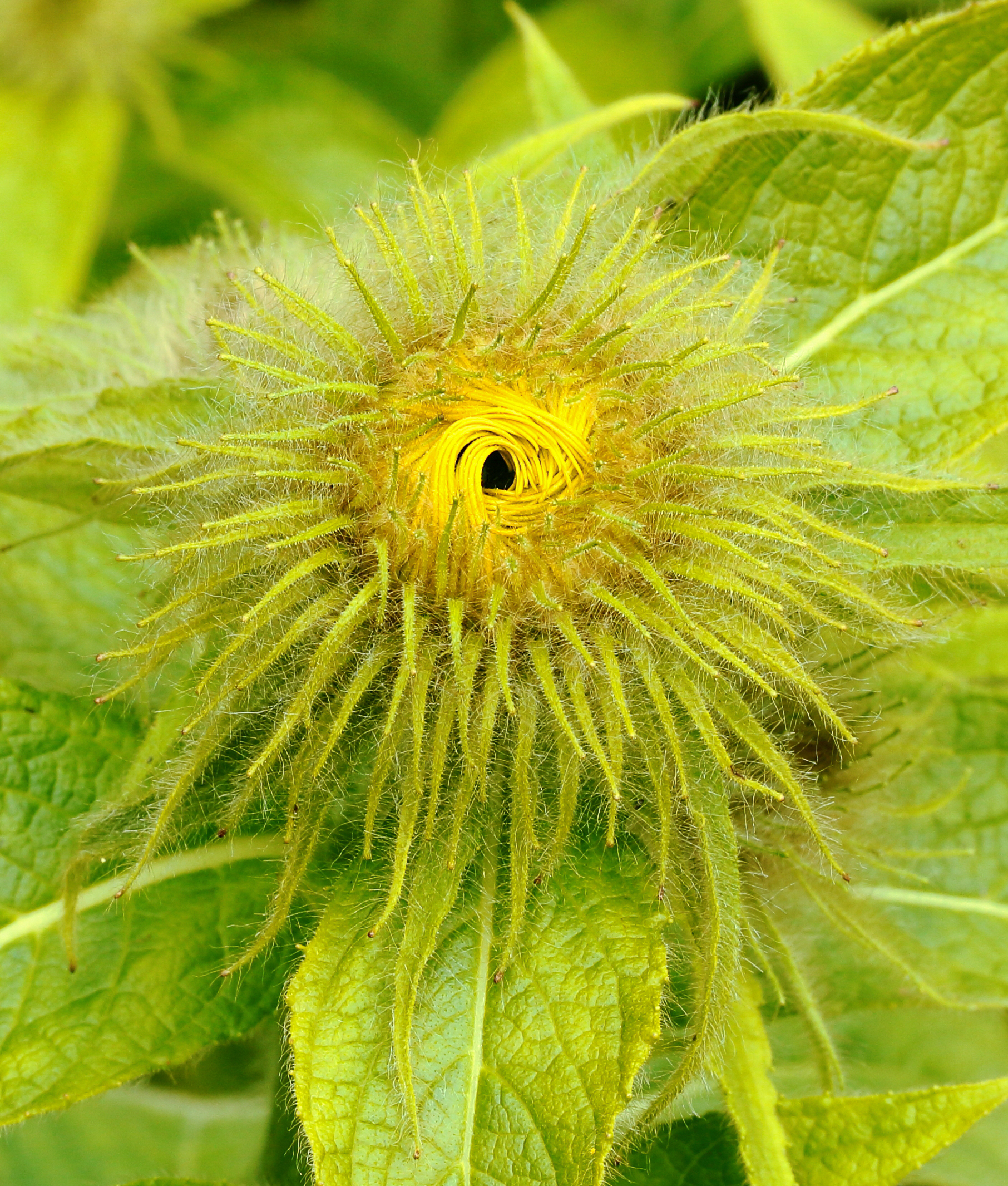
Inula hookeri. Budding flower bud.

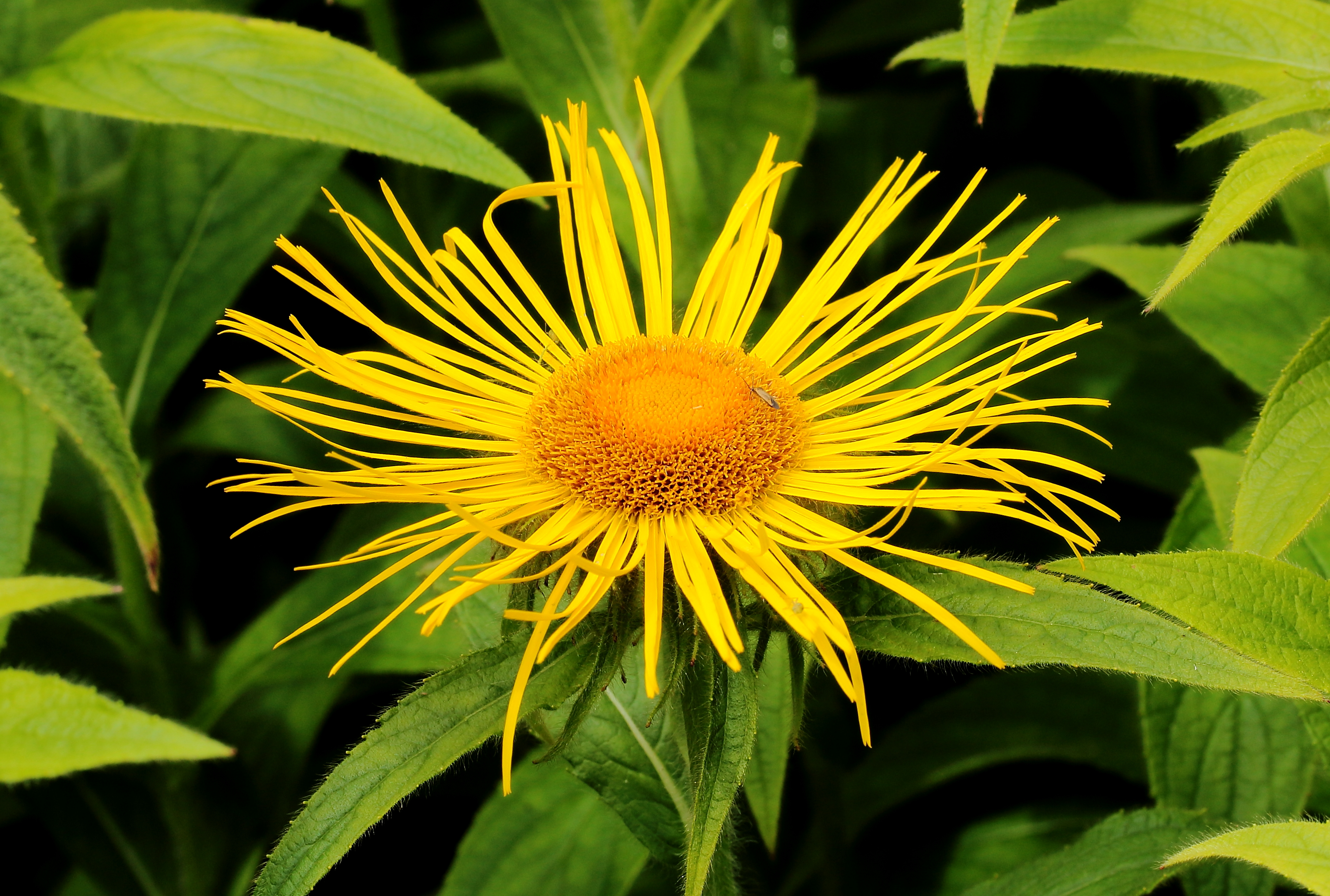
Inula hookeri. Inflorescence.
