= Dictyophorine =

Dictyophorines
- Dictyophorine A

- Dictyophorine B

Identifiers
CAS Number	(A): 177765-55-8; (B): 177765-56-9
3D model (JSmol)	(A): Interactive image; (B): Interactive image
ChEBI	(A): CHEBI:200876
ChemSpider	(A): 8212481
PubChem CID	(A): 10036916
UNII	(A): VES7757U7S
- InChI: (A): InChI=1S/C15H20O2/c1-9(2)12-5-6-14(4)8-11(16)7-10(3)15(14)13(12)17-15/h7,12-13H,1,5-6,8H2,2-4H3/t12-,13-,14-,15-/m1/s1 Key: GIOCZBPNJOEKCR-KBUPBQIOSA-N
- SMILES: (A): CC1=CC(=O)C[C@@]2([C@]13[C@H](O3)[C@H](CC2)C(=C)C)C; (B): [H][C@]12C(C)=CC(=O)C[C@@]1(C)CC[C@H](C(C)C)C2=O

Properties
Chemical formula	C_{15}H_{20}O_{2}
Molar mass	232.323 g·mol^{−1}
- Except where otherwise noted, data are given for materials in their standard state (at 25 °C [77 °F], 100 kPa). Infobox references

Dictyophorines are a pair of sesquiterpenes isolated from the fungus Phallus indusiatus (Dictyophora indusiata). These compounds are based on the eudesmane skeleton, a common structure found in plant-derived flavors and fragrances, and they are the first eudesmane derivatives isolated from fungi. Dictyophorines A and B promote the synthesis of nerve growth factor in astroglial cells.

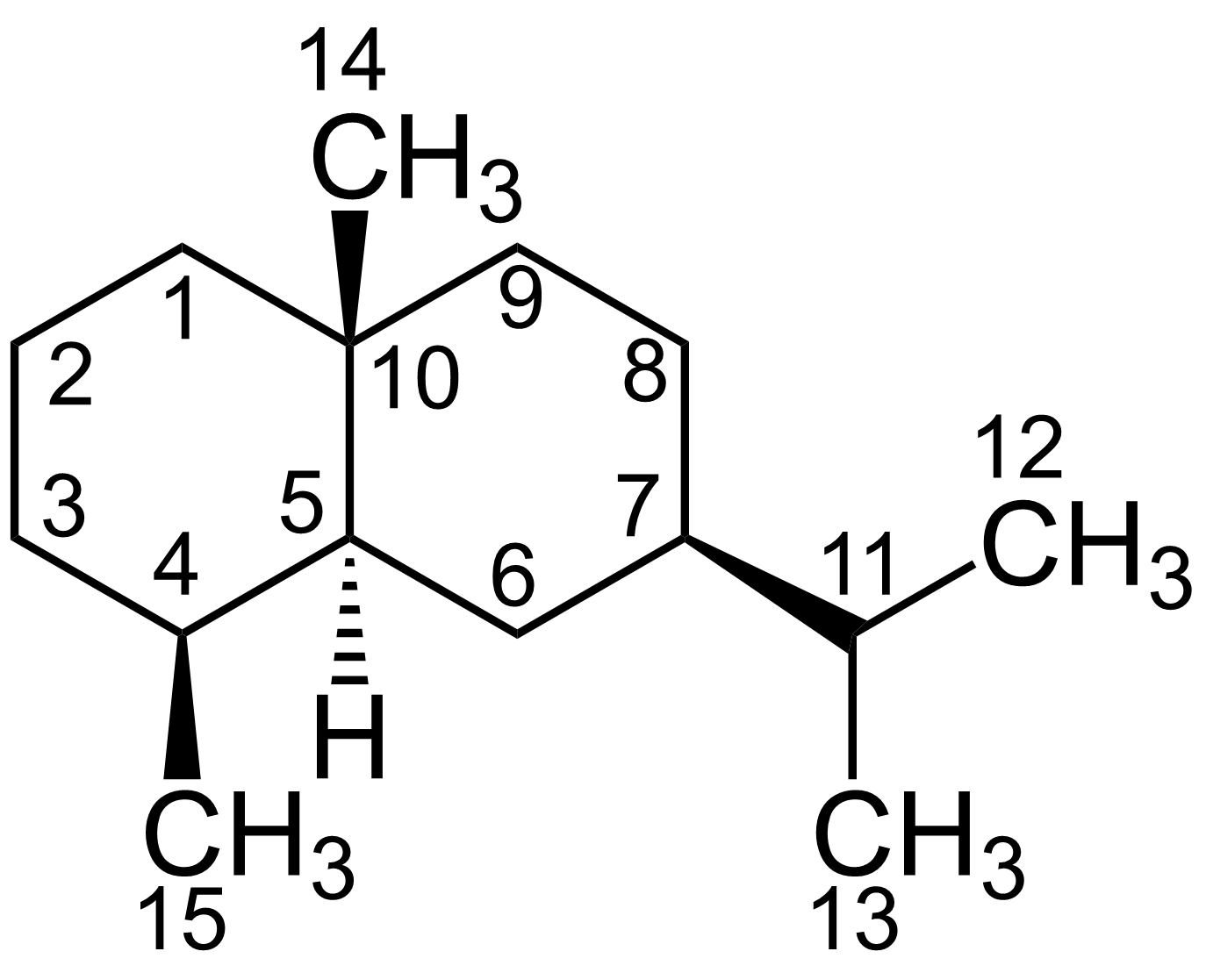
The eudesmane skeleton upon which dictyophorines are based

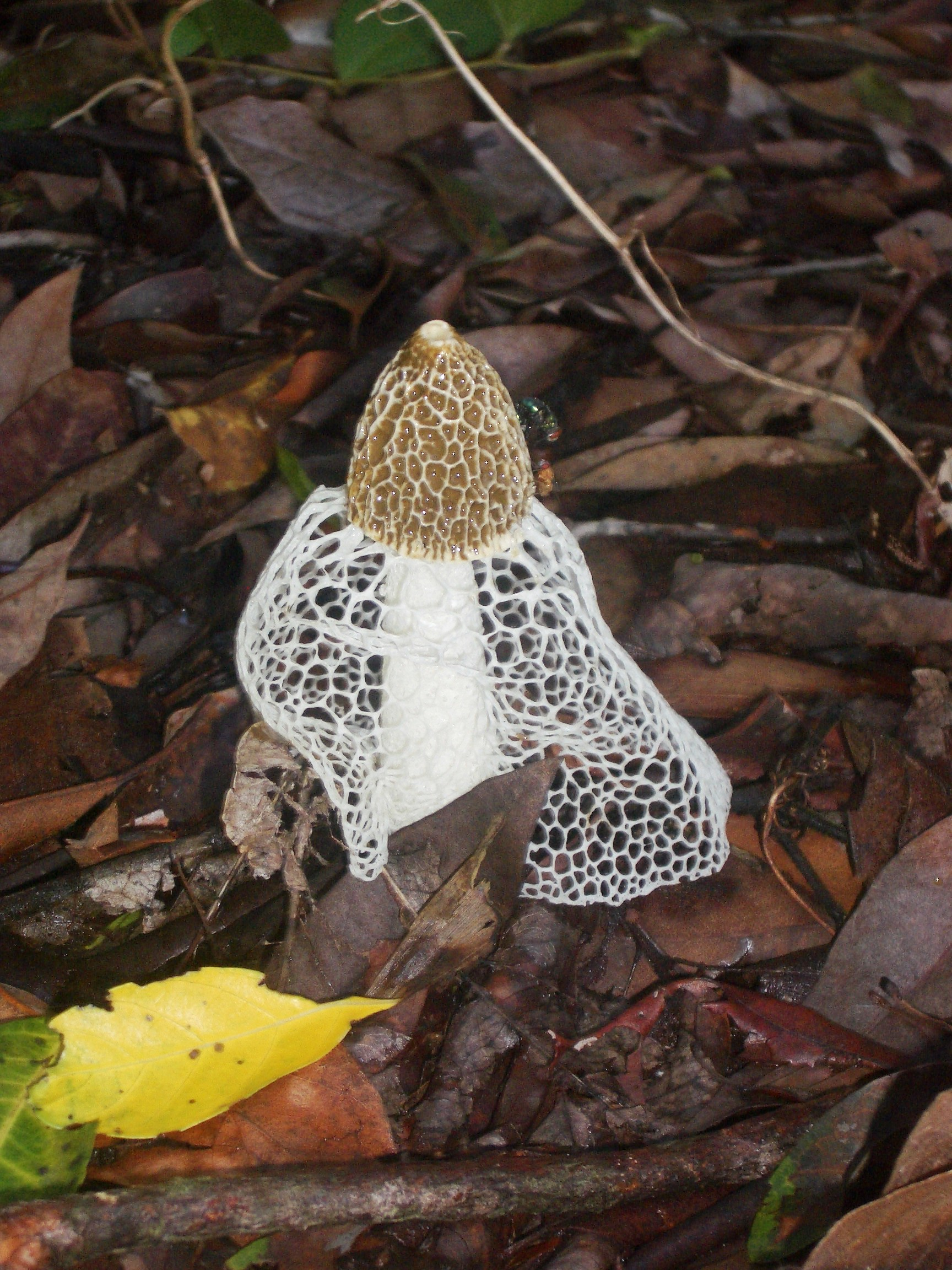
Phallus indusiatus, in Cooktown, Queensland, Australia, which produces dictyophorines
