= Coleophora inulae =

Scientific classification
- Kingdom: Animalia
- Phylum: Arthropoda
- Class: Insecta
- Order: Lepidoptera
- Family: Coleophoridae
- Genus: Coleophora
- Species: C. inulae

Binomial name
- Coleophora inulae Wocke, 1877

Species of moth

Coleophora inulae is a moth of the family Coleophoridae. It is found from Finland to the Pyrenees, Italy and Bulgaria and from Great Britain to southern Russia.

The wingspan is 13–16 mm. Adults are white with buff-coloured veins. They are on wing from June to July in western Europe.

The larvae feed on Eupatorium cannabinum, Inula conyza and Pulicaria dysenterica. The larvae overwinter twice. Full-grown larvae can be found in autumn of the second year or spring of the third year.
