= Echinopine =

Organic chemical compound, sesquiterpenoid

(+)-EchinopineA(B)
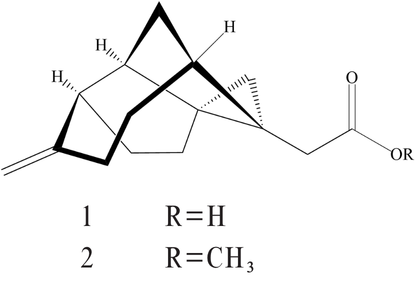
- Echinopine A/B

Names
- IUPAC names (A): 2-[(1R,2R,4R,7R,12R)-8-methylidene-2-tetracyclo[5.3.2.0^{2,4}.0^{4,12}]dodecanyl]acetic acid (B): methyl 2-[(1R,2R,4R,7R,12R)-8-methylidene-2-tetracyclo[5.3.2.0^{2,4}.0^{4,12}]dodecanyl]acetate

Identifiers
CAS Number	(A): 1013026-40-8; (B): -
3D model (JSmol)	(A): Interactive image; (B): Interactive image
ChemSpider	(A): 26233969; (B): 28533878
PubChem CID	(A): 24809003; (B): 24809059
UNII	(A): H0K500KK3D
- InChI: (A): InChI=1S/C15H20O2/c1-9-2-3-10-6-12-11(9)4-5-14(12)8-15(10,14)7-13(16)17/h10-12H,1-8H2,(H,16,17)/t10-,11+,12-,14-,15+/m1/s1 Key: XODFJJSIJDSDCR-OGMFBOKVSA-N; (B): InChI=1S/C16H22O2/c1-10-3-4-11-7-13-12(10)5-6-15(13)9-16(11,15)8-14(17)18-2/h11-13H,1,3-9H2,2H3/t11-,12+,13-,15-,16+/m1/s1 Key: OVHHBPJWMKEJNA-RHBQXOTJSA-N
- SMILES: (A): C=C1CC[C@@H]2C[C@@H]3[C@H]1CC[C@]34[C@]2(C4)CC(=O)O; (B): COC(=O)C[C@@]12C[C@@]13CC[C@@H]4[C@H]3C[C@H]2CCC4=C

Properties
Chemical formula	(A): C_{15}H_{20}O_{2} (B): C_{16}H_{22}O_{2}
Molar mass	(A): 232.32 g/mol (B): 246.34 g/mol
- Except where otherwise noted, data are given for materials in their standard state (at 25 °C [77 °F], 100 kPa). Infobox references

Echinopines A and B are sesquiterpenoids isolated from the roots of the Moroccan plant Echinops spinosus by Kiyota et al. They are characterized by a [3-5-5-7] tetracyclic carbon framework, designated as the echinopane skeleton. Echinopines A and B represent the first known natural products to possess this particular ring structure.

== Structure ==
Echinopine A is chemically designated as echinop-10(14)-en-12-oic acid, with echinopine B characterized as its corresponding methyl ester.

Both compounds contain five contiguous stereocenters at positions C1, C5, C4, C7, and C13. Conformational analysis indicates that the seven-membered ring adopts a flat chair conformation, while the two five-membered rings (C4-C5-C6-C7-C13 and C1-C2-C3-C4-C5) adopt envelope conformations. The naturally occurring isolates were assigned as the (+)-enantiomers.

== Biosynthesis ==
The biosynthesis of echinopines A and B begins with a guaiane-type precursor (guaia-4(15),10(14),11(13)-trien-12-oic acid) under acidic conditions. First, protonation at C13 initiates migration of the C7-C11 bond to C13. Subsequent deprotonation at C13 regenerates the hydroxonium ion catalyst, yielding a C11-C13 double bond conjugated to the carboxyl group. Under the ongoing acidic conditions, the carboxylic acid is protonated, promoting the double bond at C4-C15 to act as a nucleophile and attack the C11-C13 double bond, forming a [5-6-7] tricyclic carbocation intermediate via C15-C13 cyclization. Finally, the formation of the [3-5-5-7] tetracyclic echinopane skeleton is concluded with a cyclization at C13-C4 driven by the elimination of the C13 proton.

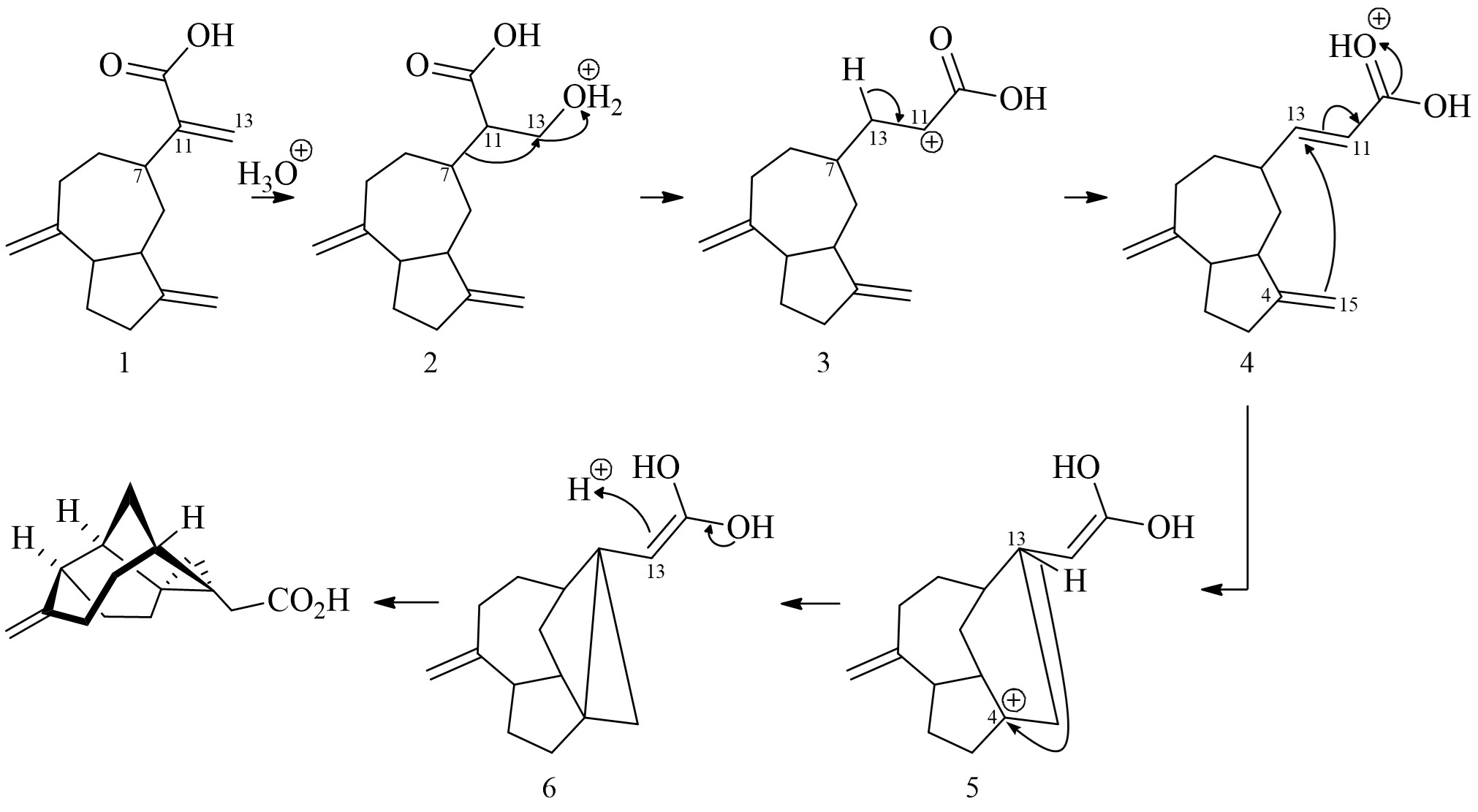
The biosynthesis of echinopine

== Laboratory synthesis ==
Despite their lack of uncovered biological activity, echinopines A and B have motivated considerable synthetic interest.

=== Magauer (2009) ===
Echinopine A and B were first synthesized by Magauer, Mulzer, and Tiefenbacher in 2009 in 21 steps, starting from 1,5 cyclooctadiene. Their approach featured a Myers [3.3]-sigmatropic rearrangement to form a substituted bicyclooctane intermediate that could subsequently be transformed into the echinopane skeleton via ring-closing metathesis.

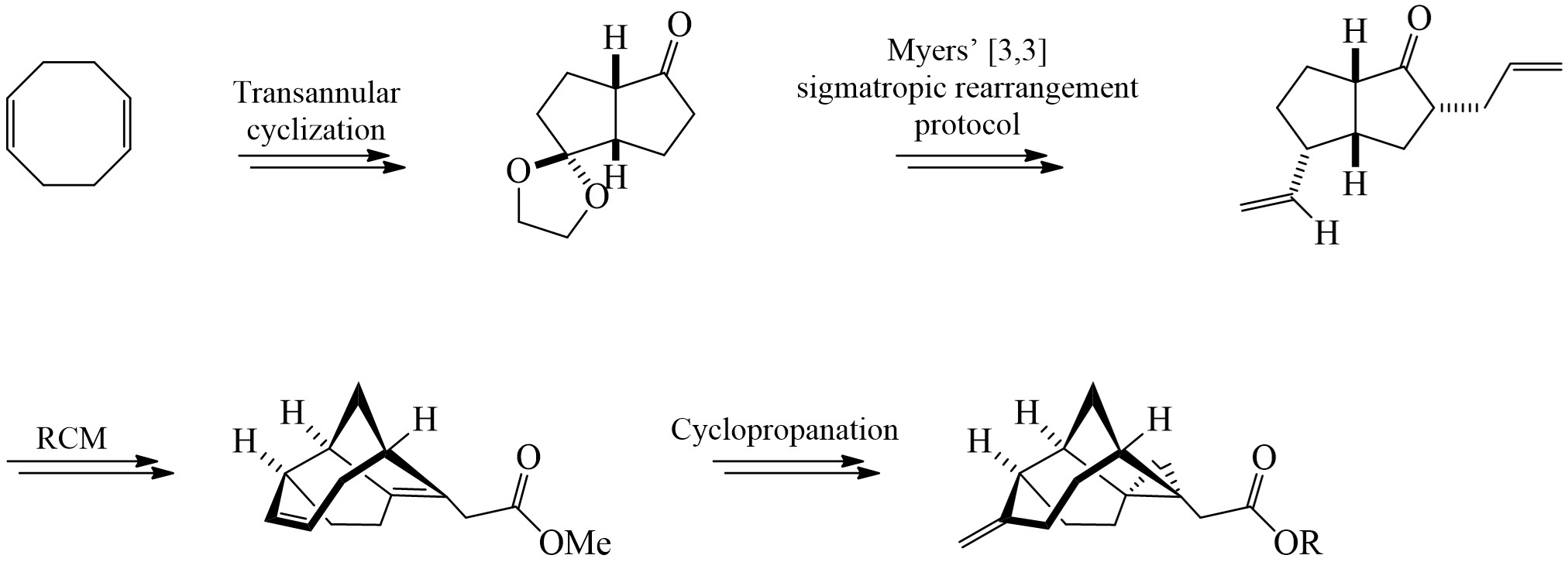
Tiefenbacher's total synthesis of echinopine

=== Chen (2010,2011) ===
In 2010 and 2011, Chen et al. developed three generations of bioinspired total and formal syntheses.Their strategies were refined with the goal of emulating the biosynthetic pathway to echinopine.

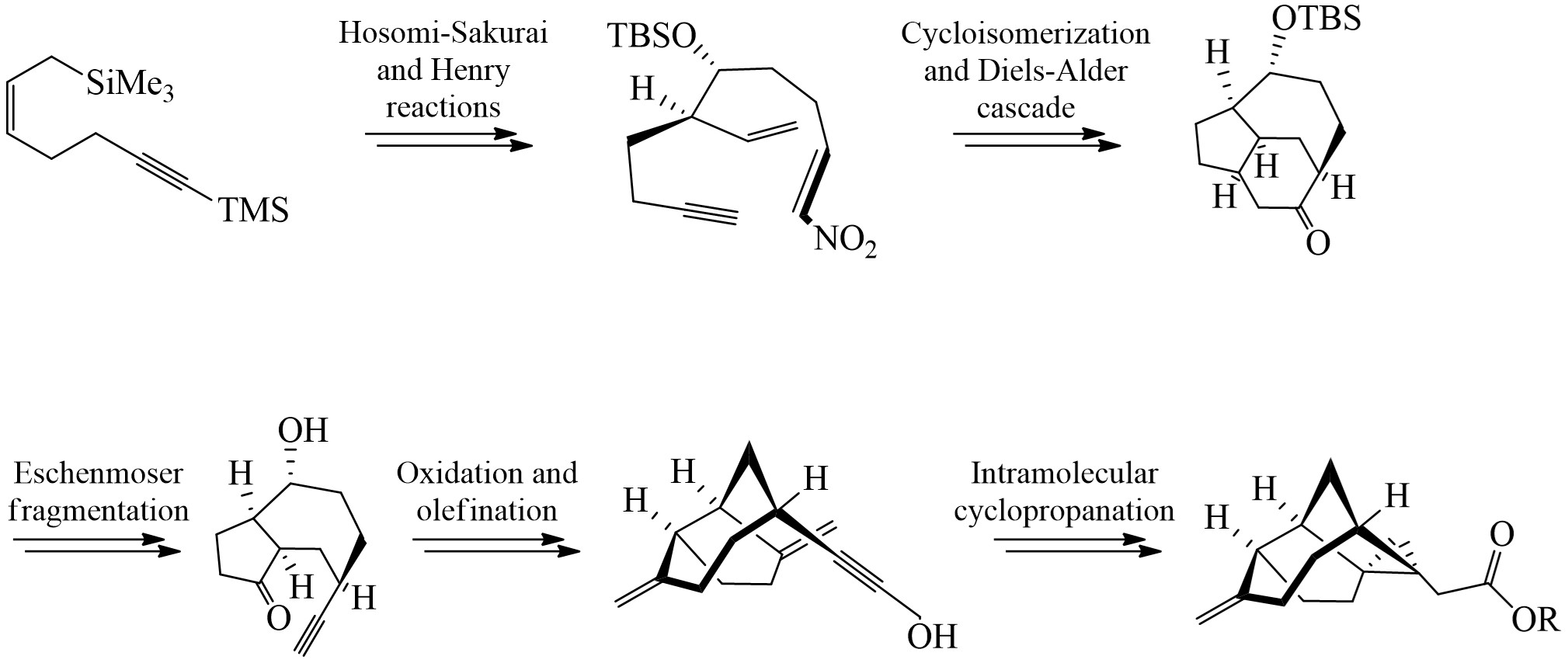
Chen’s total synthesis (2011) ‘Chen’s third generation synthesis’

=== Vanderwal (2012) ===
In 2012, Vanderwal and co-workers completed a 13-step total synthesis of racemic echinopine B starting from ethyl 4-oxocyclohexanecarboxylate. The route utilized a platinum(II)-catalyzed 5-exo-dig cycloisomerization of a propargylic ether precursor to construct the tricyclic [3-5-5] core.

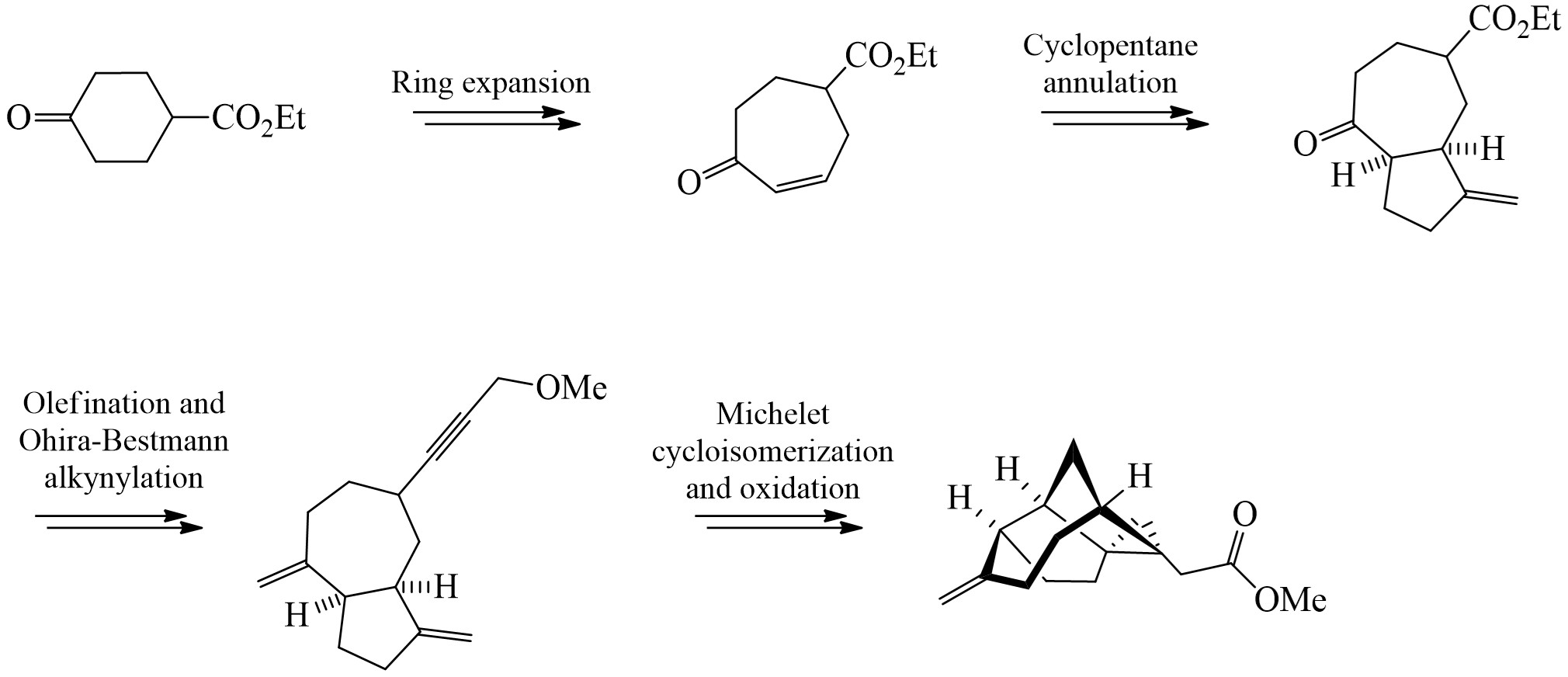
Vanderwal's total synthesis of echinopine (2012)

=== Liang (2013) ===
Liang et al. achieved an 18-step synthesis of racemic echinopines A and B in 2013. The pathway included an aldol-Henry reaction cascade to produce a trans-decalin intermediate, a Tiffeneau-Demjanov rearrangement for ring expansion, and an intramolecular 1,3-cycloaddition.

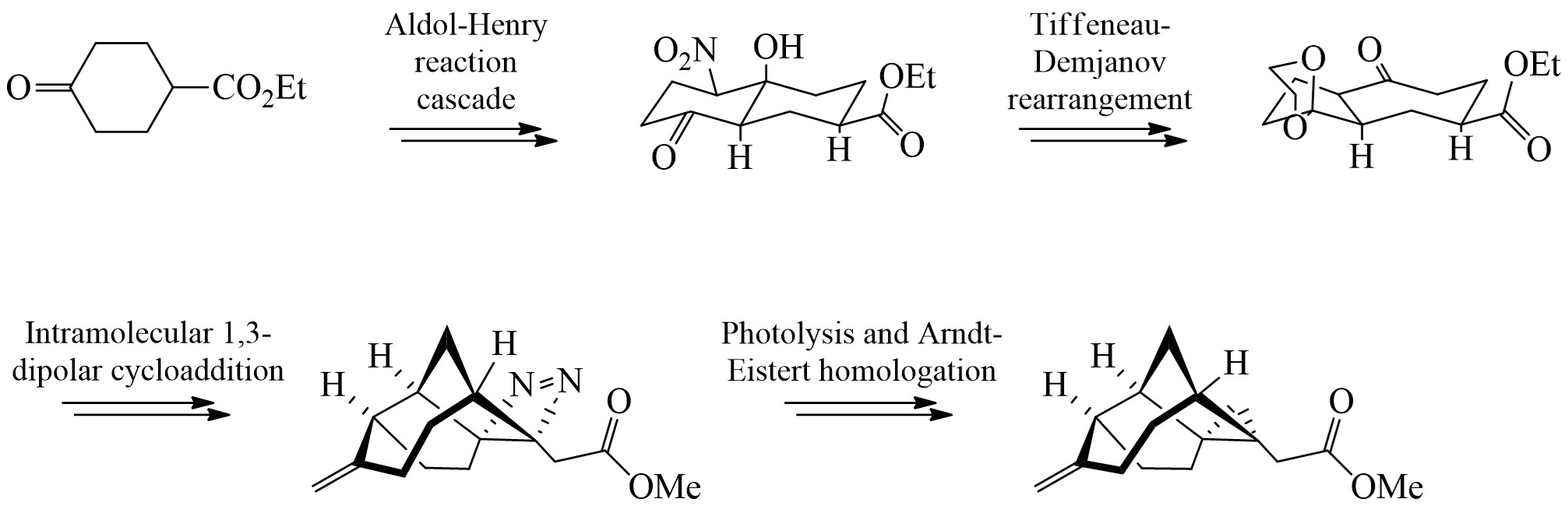
Liang's total synthesis of echinopine (2013)

=== Misra (2015) ===
In 2015, Misra et al. executed a formal synthesis starting with a photochemical, Cr(0)-promoted [6π + 2π] cycloaddition between an alkynoate and cycloheptatriene to form a bicyclo[4.2.1]nonane intermediate. This intermediate was subsequently converted to a tricyclic ester intermediate previously established by Magauer, Mulzer, and Tiefenbacher.

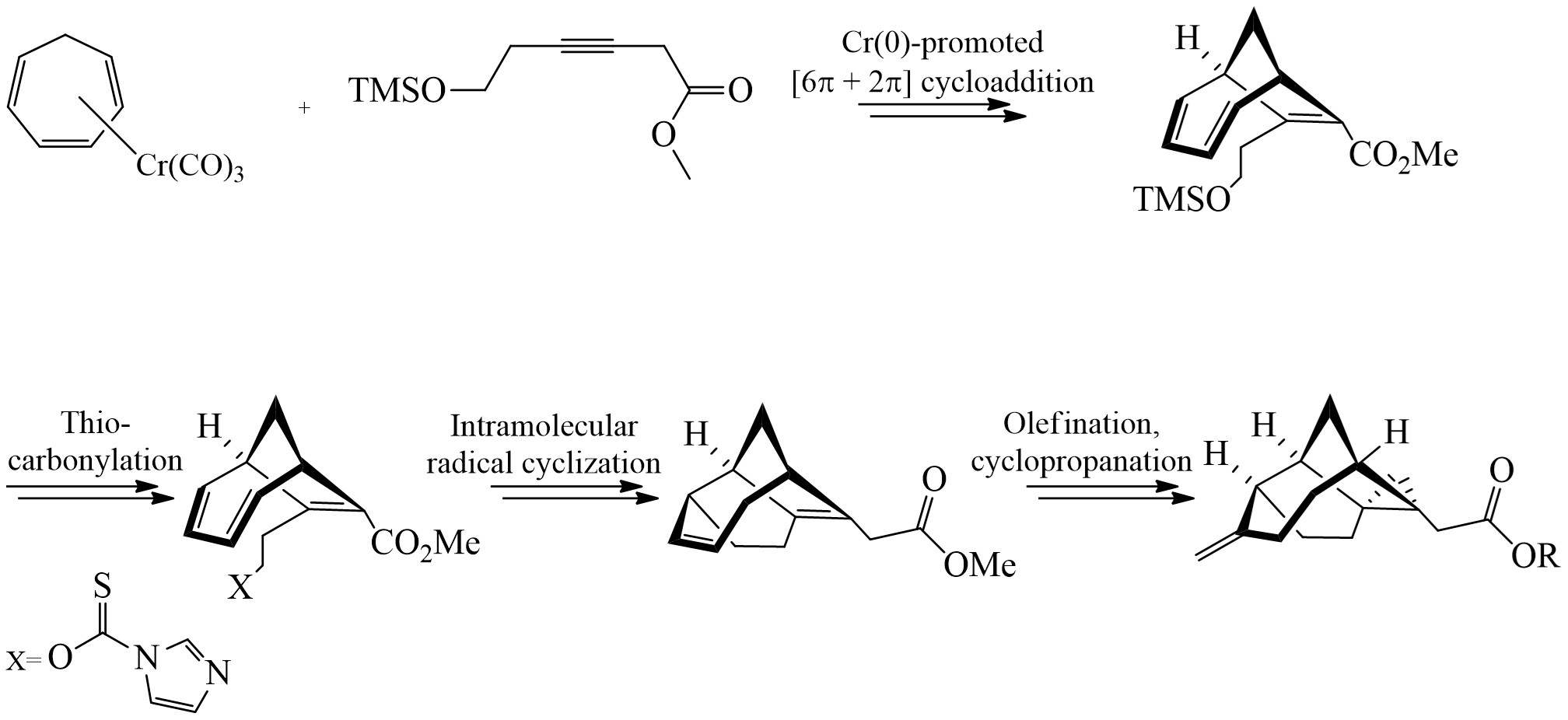
Misra's formal synthesis of echinopine (2015)
