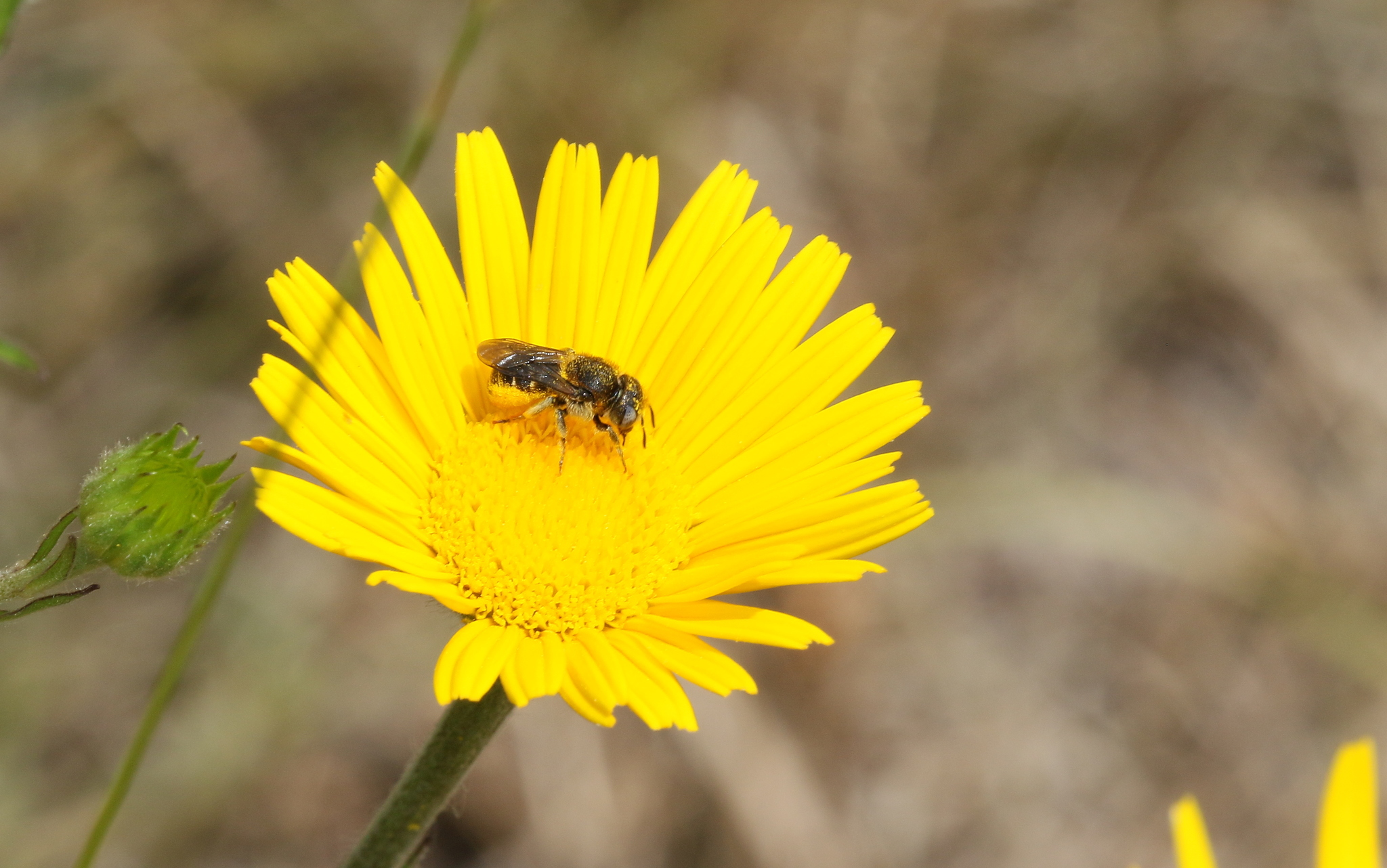
- In Freising, Germany

Scientific classification
- Kingdom: Animalia
- Phylum: Arthropoda
- Clade: Pancrustacea
- Class: Insecta
- Order: Hymenoptera
- Family: Megachilidae
- Genus: Osmia
- Species: O. spinulosa

Binomial name
- Osmia spinulosa (Kirby, 1802)

Synonyms
- Hoplosmia spinulosa (Kirby, 1802); Apis spinulosa Kirby, 1802; Anthocopa spinulosa (Kirby, 1802); Osmia euchreiformis Radoszkowski, 1882

= Osmia spinulosa =

Species of bee

Osmia spinulosa, also known as the spined mason bee, is a species of bee in the genus Osmia.

== Description ==
7–8 mm. Males: Tergite 15 with terminal ligaments, Tergite 7 with a thorn. To be recognized in the field with experience. Females: Tergites 1-6 with terminal ligaments. Scutellum laterally with a pointed thorn each. Tibial spur red.

== Range ==
Osmia spinulosa is distributed from the Spanish foothills of the Pyrenees (Girona) across Europe, Asia Minor, Caucasus and western Central Asia to the Central Siberian mountains (Tomsk, Kemerovo, Altai Republic); north to South Wales and Central England, in Scandinavia to 60°N in Norway and Sweden, in Russia to Kirov and Perm; south to Sicily and southern Bulgaria. It has been detected from all federal states in Germany with the exception of Schleswig-Holstein. It is widespread in Germany, but only sporadically in the North German lowlands. Moderately frequent, especially in the hill country and in the limestone low mountain ranges. It has been found in the Alps up to 2000 m. It has been reported in every state in Austria. It has been recorded in the Swiss cantons of Geneva, Neuchâtel, Bern, Basel, Schaffhausen, Valais, Graubünden and St. Gallen, with historical records from the canton of Vaud.

== Habitat ==
Mainly settlements with focus on dry, warm habitats on calcareous subsoil. It occurs on inland dunes and drifting sand fields, weathering heaps, disused quarries, fallow sheep pastures (juniper heaths), warm forest fringes, structurally rich, old fallow vineyards, uneven meadows, rarely dry and warm ruderal areas.

== Ecology ==
Osmia spinulosa is an univoltine species. It flies from early June to mid-August and overwinters as a resting larva in a snail shell.

Osmia spinulosa is an oligolectic species specializing in Asteraceae. A preference for certain species is not discernible. Pollen sources are Anthemis tinctoria, Anthemis arvensis, Inula hirta, Inula salicina, Inula ensifolia, Buphthalmum salicifolium, Pulicaria dysenterica, Aster amellus, Senecio jacobaea, Echinops spaerocephalus, Cirsium vulgare, Cirsium arvense, Carduus crisous, Cichorium intybus, Picris hieracioides, Leontodon autumnalis and Hieracium pilosella. Telekia speciosa and Calendula officinalis are also used in the Munich Botanical Garden. Buphthalmum is of great importance as a source of pollen in the limestone mountains. The females do not visit the same flowers all the time; during one flight they regularly visit up to four different Asteraceae (e.g. Hieracium / Centaurea / Anthemis / Echinops). These plant species can also serve as sources of nectar.

This bee nests in empty smaller snail shells like Helicella itala and Helicella obvia, Cepaea nemoralis, Zebrina detrita and Futicicola fruticum, once also found in a small shell of Helix pomatia. The building material used is chewed plant parts (plant mortar) from the edges of the leaves of Sanguisorba minor and Potentilla reptans and not, as previously suspected due to a misinterpretation, hare or sheep dung. In contrast to other snail shell nests, the surface of the snail shell is not covered with vegetable mortar. After completing the nest, the bee turns

Stelis odontopyga is a cuckoo bee which parasitises Osmia spinulosa. Other known parasites are Stelis phaeoptera, Chrysura cuprea, Chrysura dichroa, Chrysura trimaculata, Melittobia acasta, Pteromalus apum and Pteromalus venustus. Anthrax aethiops is also a brood parasite.

== Etymology ==
Diminutive from Latin "spinosa" = "thorny, prickly"; because of the thorny scutellum.

== Taxonomy ==
Subgenus Hoplosmia THOMSON, 1872.
