= Inula squarrosa =

Inula squarrosa may refer to four different species of plants:

- Inula squarrosa Krock., a synonym for Pentanema britannica (L.) D.Gut.Larr. et al.
- Inula squarrosa Griseb., a synonym for Pentanema salicinum (L.) D.Gut.Larr. et al.
- Inula squarrosa L., a synonym for Pentanema spiraeifolium (L.) D.Gut.Larr. et al.
- Inula squarrosa Bernh. ex DC., a synonym for Pentanema squarrosum (L.) D.Gut.Larr. et al.
