= Oidaematophorus constanti =

Scientific classification
- Kingdom: Animalia
- Phylum: Arthropoda
- Clade: Pancrustacea
- Class: Insecta
- Order: Lepidoptera
- Family: Pterophoridae
- Genus: Oidaematophorus
- Species: O. constanti

Binomial name
- Oidaematophorus constanti (Ragonot, 1875)

Synonyms
- Oedaematophorus constanti Ragonot, 1875; Oidaematophorus constantini

Species of plume moth

Oidaematophorus constanti is a moth of the family Pterophoridae. It is found on Corsica and Sardinia and in Spain, France, Germany, the Czech Republic, Austria, Slovenia, Slovakia, Hungary, Romania and North Macedonia.

The wingspan is about 28 millimetres (1.1 in).

The larvae feed on Inula montana, Inula vaillantii, Inula hellenium, Inula helenioides, Inula oculus christi and ploughman's-spikenard (Inula conyza).
