= Inula involucrata =

Inula involucrata may refer to two different species of plants:

- Inula involucrata Kalenic., a synonym for Pentanema hirtum (L.) D.Gut.Larr. et al.
- Inula involucrata Miq., a synonym for Pentanema salicinum (L.) D.Gut.Larr. et al.
