= C17H14O8 =

The molecular formula C_{17}H_{14}O_{8} (molar mass : 346.28 g/mol, exact mass : 346.068867) may refer to:

- Axillarin, a flavonol
- Eupatolitin, a flavonol
- Spinacetin, a flavonol
- Syringetin, a flavonol
