= Inula cordata =

Inula cordata may refer to two different species of plants:

- Inula cordata Boiss., a synonym for Pentanema salicinum (L.) D.Gut.Larr. et al.
- Inula cordata Freyn ex Nyman, a synonym for Pentanema spiraeifolium (L.) D.Gut.Larr. et al.
