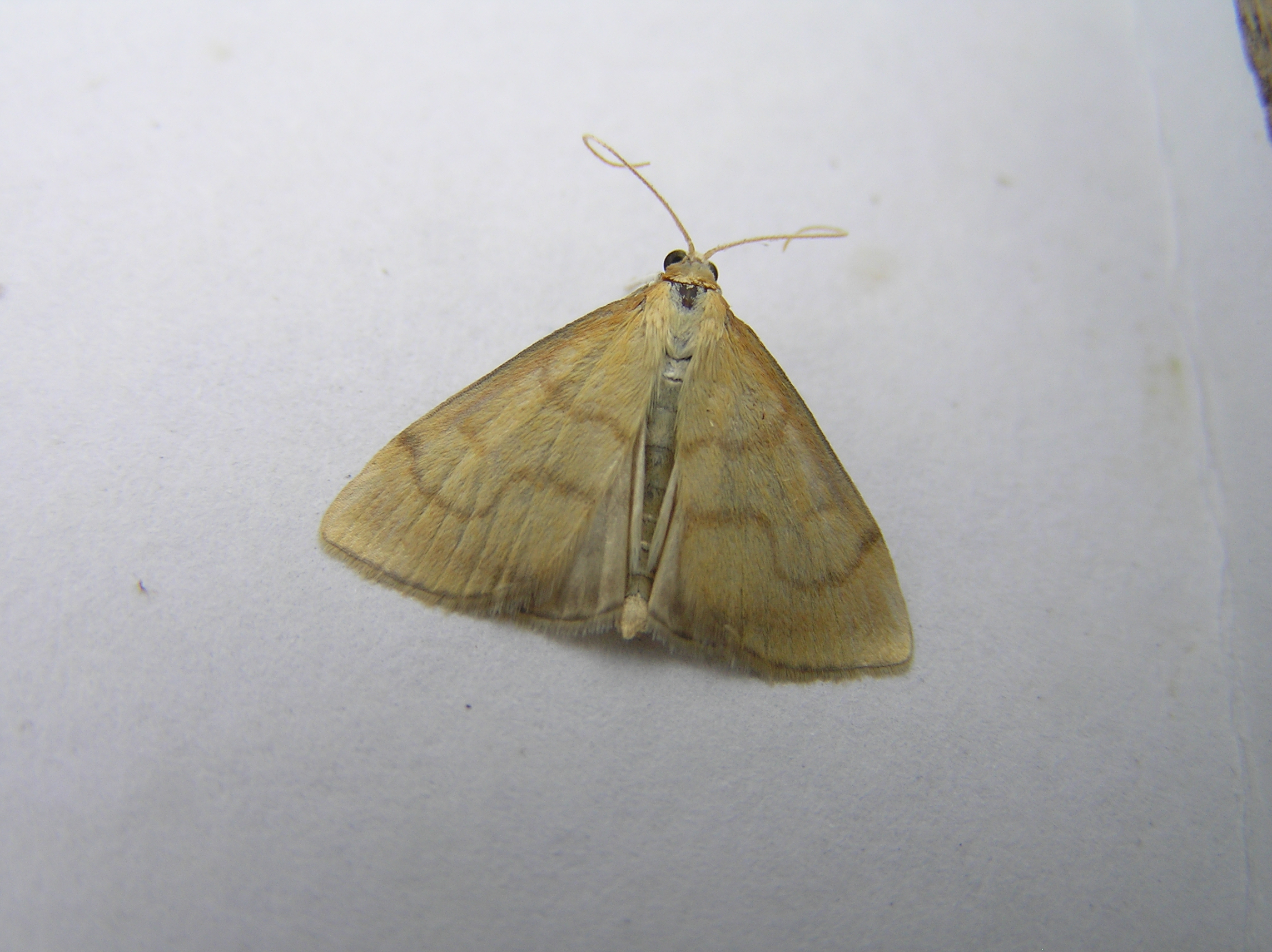

Scientific classification
- Kingdom: Animalia
- Phylum: Arthropoda
- Clade: Pancrustacea
- Class: Insecta
- Order: Lepidoptera
- Family: Crambidae
- Genus: Anania
- Species: A. crocealis

Binomial name
- Anania crocealis (Hübner, 1796)

Synonyms
- Pyralis crocealis Hübner, 1796; Ebulea crocealis; Ebulea crocealis marionalis Leraut, 1996; Pyralis ochrealis Hübner, 1796; Epicorsia crocotolalis Hübner, 1825; Pionea crocealis f. aest. minoralis Müller-Rutz, 1920; Pionea crocealis var. signatalis Caradja, 1916; Pyrausta stahuljaki Szent-Ivány & Uhrik-Meszáros, 1942

= Anania crocealis =

Species of moth

Anania crocealis is a species of moth of the family Crambidae. It was described by Jacob Hübner in 1796 and is found in Europe.

The wingspan is 22–25 mm. Forewings yellow-ochreous; lines fuscous, first curved, second curved, strongly sinuate inwards below middle; orbicular dot and linear discal mark fuscous; a dark fuscous terminal line. Hindwings whitish grey, with faint darker second line. Larva dull green; dorsal line dark greenish-grey; head black. See also Parsons et al.

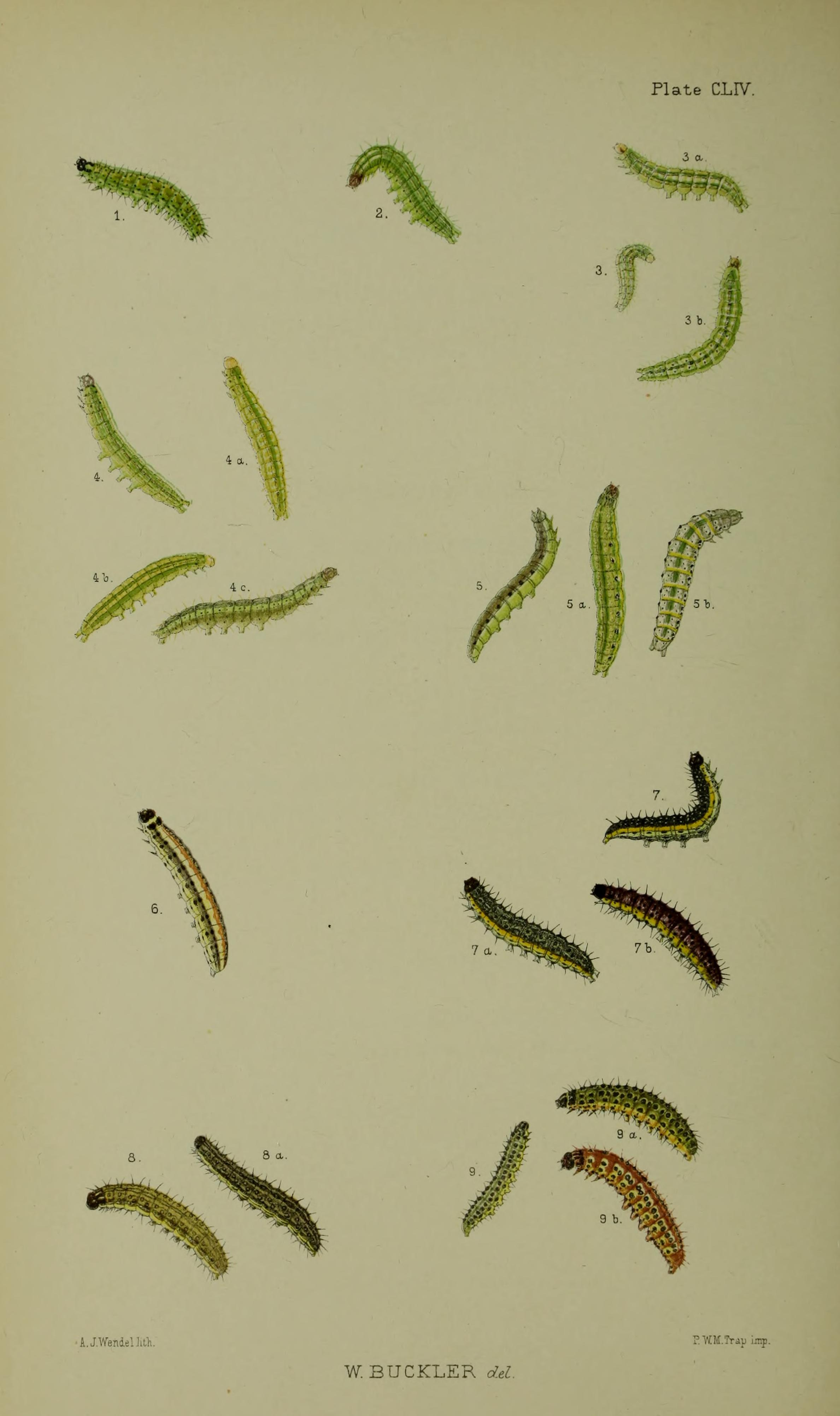
Larva after final moult (#1, top left)

The larvae feed on Pulicaria dysenterica, Inula conyzae, and Inula salicina. In Belgium, the moth flies from early May to mid-September.
