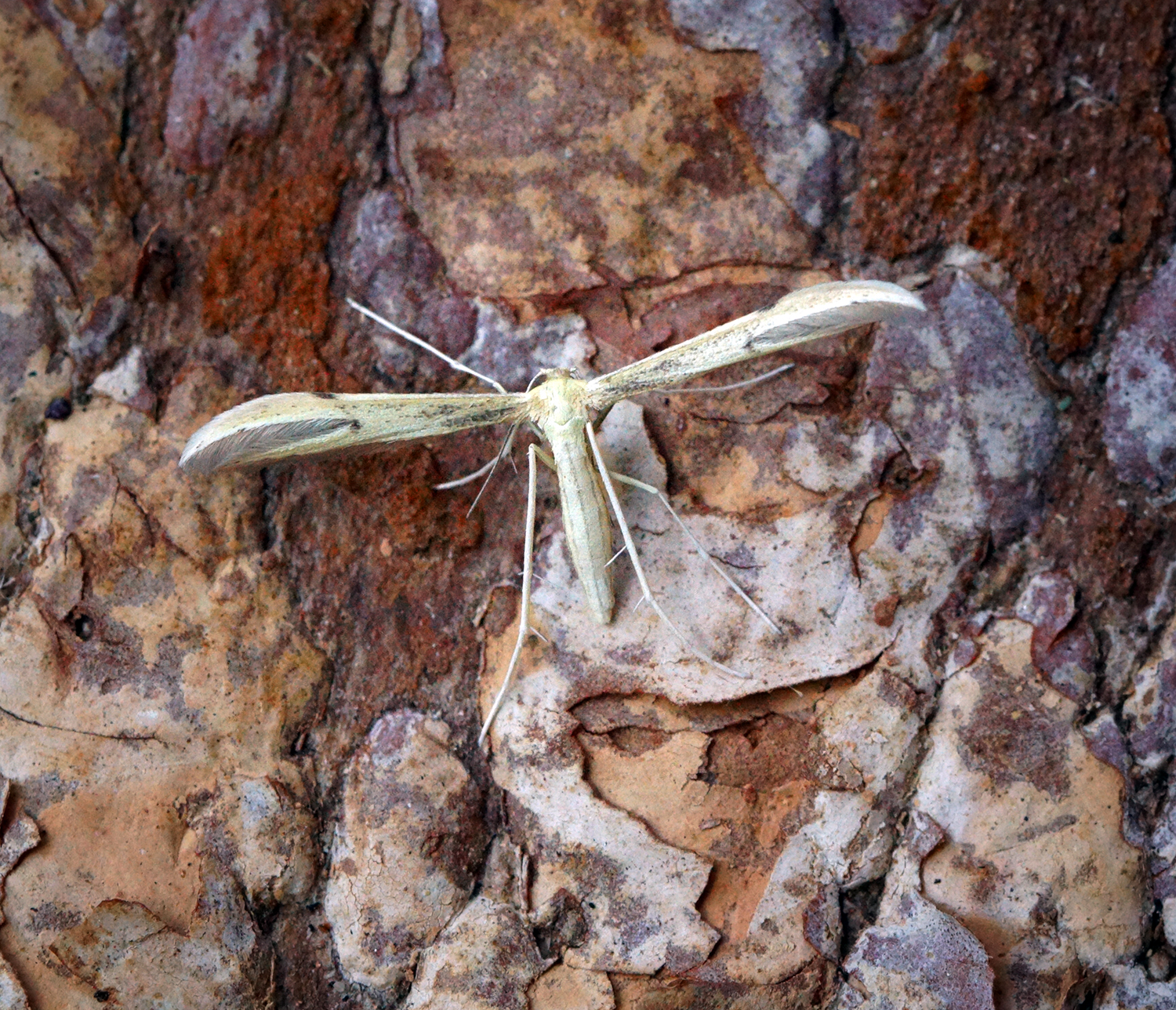

Scientific classification
- Domain: Eukaryota
- Kingdom: Animalia
- Phylum: Arthropoda
- Class: Insecta
- Order: Lepidoptera
- Family: Pterophoridae
- Genus: Hellinsia
- Species: H. carphodactyla

Binomial name
- Hellinsia carphodactyla (Hübner, 1813)

Synonyms
- List: Hellinsia carphodactylus; Euleioptilus carphodactyla (Hübner, 1813); Euleioptilus carphodactylus; Alucita carphodactyla Hübner, 1813; Leioptilus carphodactylus var. buphthalmi Hofmann, 1898

= Hellinsia carphodactyla =

Species of plume moth

Hellinsia carphodactyla (also known as the citron plume) is a moth of the family Pterophoridae, first described by Jacob Hübner in 1813. It is known from most of Europe (except Scandinavia), Asia Minor and North Africa.

== Description ==
The wingspan is 14–23 millimetres (0.55–0.91 in). Adults are on wing in June, and again in August and September in two generations in western Europe. Larvae have also been recorded on Inula bifrons, Inula hirta, Inula montana, Carlina species, including carline thistle (Carlina vulgaris) and ox-eye (Buphthalmum salicifolium).

Pupation takes place in the excavated stem parts.
