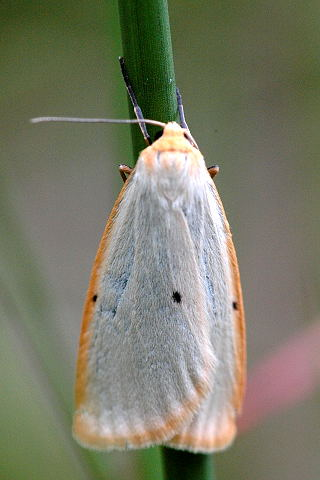
- Cybosia mesomella f. albescens (ivory‑coloured form)

Scientific classification
- Kingdom: Animalia
- Phylum: Arthropoda
- Clade: Pancrustacea
- Class: Insecta
- Order: Lepidoptera
- Superfamily: Noctuoidea
- Family: Erebidae
- Subfamily: Arctiinae
- Genus: Cybosia; Hubner, 1819
- Species: C. mesomella

Binomial name
- Cybosia mesomella (Linnaeus, 1758)

Synonyms
- Generic: Ecteina Rambur, [1866]; Specific: Phalaena mesomella Linnaeus, 1758; Noctua eborina Denis & Schiffermüller, 1775; Phalaena quatrilis Geoffroy, 1785; Noctua eborea Esper, 1787; Lithosia lutarella Haworth, 1809; Cybosia mesomella eremella Vorbrodt, 1914; Cybosia mesomellula Strand, 1922; Cybosia albida Catherine, 1922; Cybosia obscura Lempke, 1961; Cybosia cremella Krulikovski, 1908; Cybosia flava Preissecker, 1909; Cybosia mesomella f. flavobscura Lempke, 1964; Cybosia mesomella f. postnigrescens Lempke, 1964; Cybosia mesomella ab. postpallida Cockayne, 1951; Cybosia mesomella f. postpallida Lempke, 1964

= Cybosia =

Genus and species of moth

Cybosia is a monotypic genus of moth in the subfamily Arctiinae erected by Jacob Hübner in 1819. Its only species, Cybosia mesomella, the four-dotted footman, was first described by Carl Linnaeus in his 1758 10th edition of Systema Naturae.

== Forms ==
- Cybosia mesomella f. flava (yellow)
- Cybosia mesomella f. albescens (ivory colored)

== Description ==
The wingspan is 25–33 mm. The basic colour of the forewings may be yellow or ivory greyish with yellow borders. The forewings show in the middle four small black dots (hence the common name of this species). The hindwings are grey, sometimes with yellowish edges. The thorax and the abdomen are whitish, covered with fine hairs.

== Biology ==
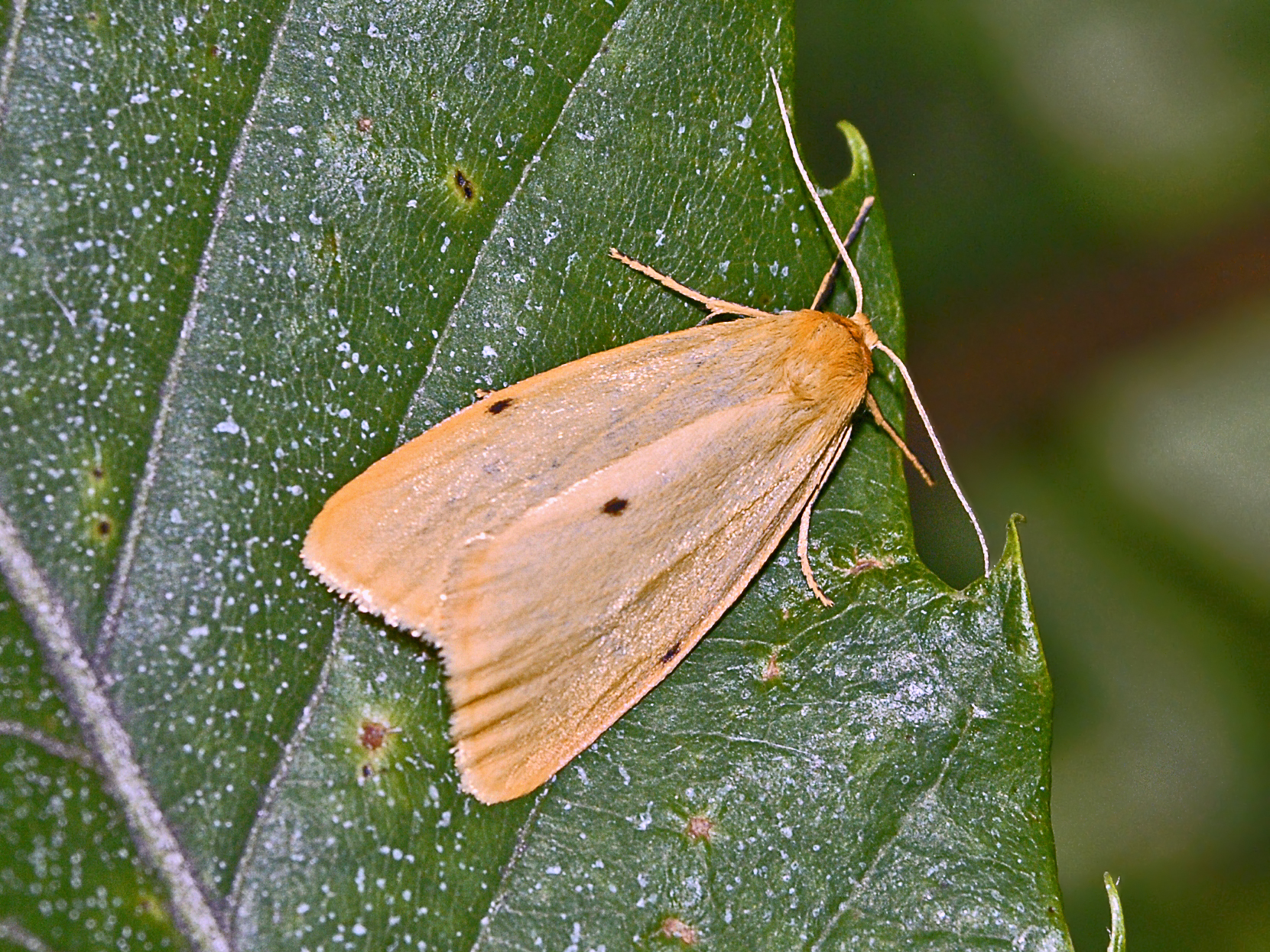
Cybosia mesomella f. flava (yellow form)

This species has one generation per year. Females lay eggs in early July on the larval food plants. The eggs hatch in August or early September. The larvae overwinter and pupate the following spring, from May up to the beginning of June. The moths fly at dusk from June to mid-August depending on location. The larvae feed mainly after dark on low vegetation such as heather, willows, Leontodon autumnalis and Vaccinium uliginosum. They are lichen and algae feeders like most other lithosiines.

== Distribution ==
This species can be found in most of Europe except Spain, in the east Palearctic realm and in the Near East.

== Habitat ==
Cybosia mesomella prefers warm, moist and sunny environment, deciduous and mixed forests, heaths, moorland, damp grassland, fens, wet meadows and open woodlands.
