= Hellinsia inulae =

Scientific classification
- Domain: Eukaryota
- Kingdom: Animalia
- Phylum: Arthropoda
- Class: Insecta
- Order: Lepidoptera
- Family: Pterophoridae
- Genus: Hellinsia
- Species: H. inulae

Binomial name
- Hellinsia inulae Zeller, 1852

Synonyms
- Pterophorus inulae Zeller, 1852; Pterophorus coniodactylus Staudinger, 1859; Oidaematophorus alpinus Gibeaux & Picard, 1992

Species of plume moth

Hellinsia inulae is a moth of the family Pterophoridae. It is found on the Canary Islands, Iberian Peninsula, Corsica, Sardinia, Sicily, Cyprus and in Germany, Austria, Italy, the Czech Republic, Poland, Slovakia, Hungary, Croatia, Romania, Bulgaria, Bosnia and Herzegovina, North Macedonia, Greece, Russia, North Africa and Asia Minor.

The wingspan is 18–19 millimetres (0.71–0.75 in).

The larvae feed on Inula britannica, Inula salicina, Inula viscosa and Dittrichia viscosa.
