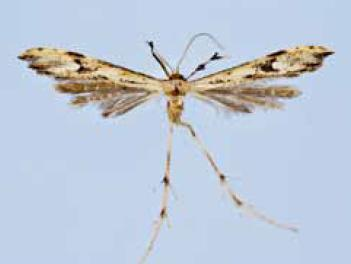

Scientific classification
- Kingdom: Animalia
- Phylum: Arthropoda
- Class: Insecta
- Order: Lepidoptera
- Family: Pterophoridae
- Genus: Hellinsia
- Species: H. alfaroi

Binomial name
- Hellinsia alfaroi Gielis, 2011

= Hellinsia alfaroi =

Species of plume moth

Hellinsia alfaroi is a moth of the family Pterophoridae. It is found in Ecuador.

The wingspan is 17 mm. Adults are on wing in April, at an altitude of 1,100 meters.
