= Aster pubescens =

Aster pubescens may refer to three different species of plants:

- Aster pubescens Nees, a synonym for Symphyotrichum cordifolium (L.) G.L.Nesom
- Aster pubescens Moench, a synonym for Pentanema spiraeifolium (L.) D.Gut.Larr. et al.
- Aster pubescens Lam., a synonym for Aster tataricus L.f.
