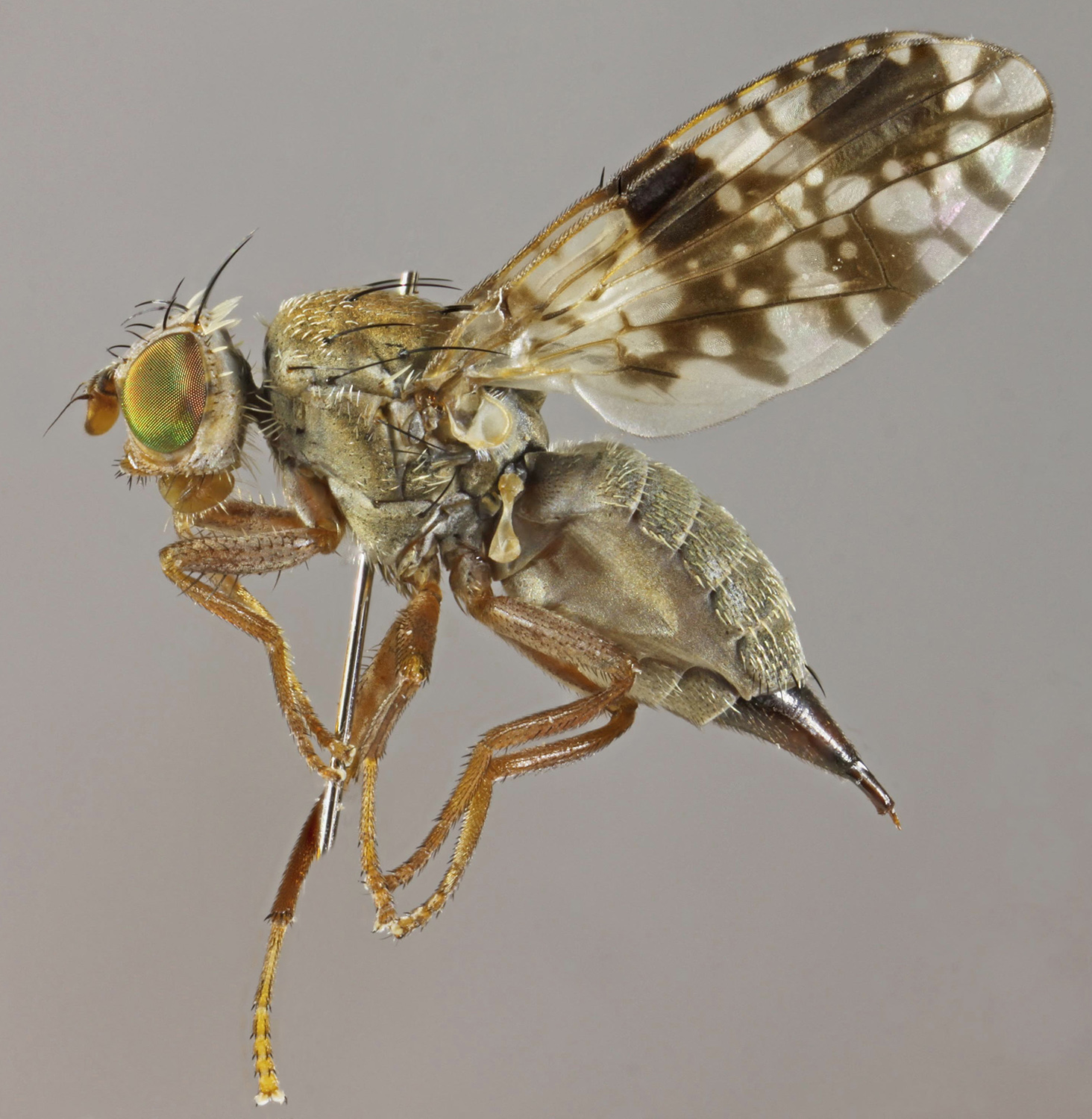
- Tephritis leontodontis North Wales

Scientific classification
- Kingdom: Animalia
- Phylum: Arthropoda
- Class: Insecta
- Order: Diptera
- Family: Tephritidae
- Subfamily: Tephritinae
- Tribe: Tephritini
- Genus: Tephritis
- Species: T. leontodontis

Binomial name
- Tephritis leontodontis (De Geer, 1776)

Synonyms
- Musca leontodontis De Geer, 1776

= Tephritis leontodontis =

Species of fly

Tephritis leontodontis is a species of fly in the family Tephritidae, the gall flies. It is found in the Palearctic. The larvae feed on Scorzoneroides autumnalis.
