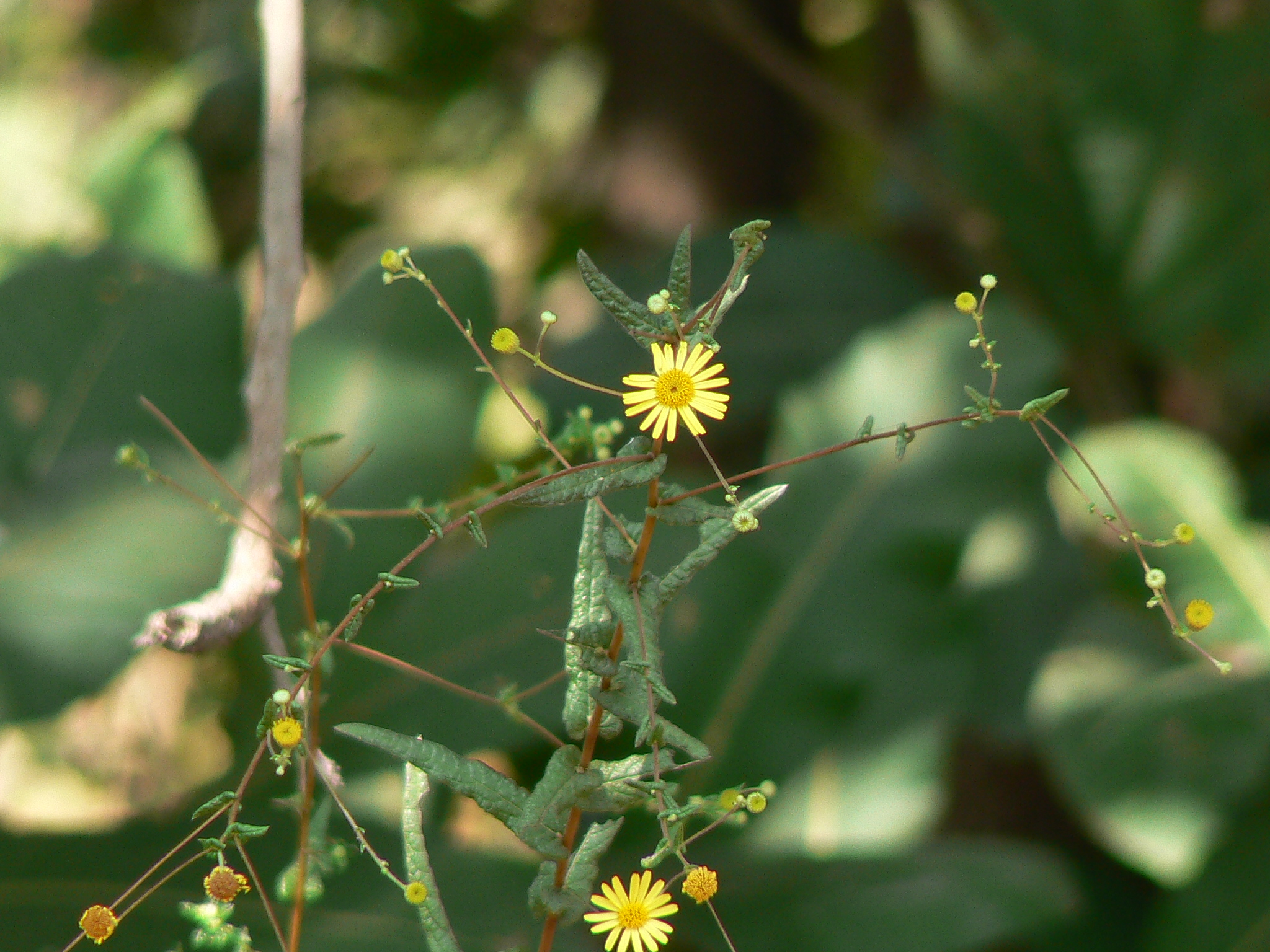
- Vicoa indica (formerly Pentanema indicum)

Scientific classification
- Kingdom: Plantae
- Clade: Tracheophytes
- Clade: Angiosperms
- Clade: Eudicots
- Clade: Asterids
- Order: Asterales
- Family: Asteraceae
- Genus: Vicoa; Cass.

Type species
- Cass.

= Vicoa =

Genus of flowering plants

Vicoa is a genus of flowering plants belonging to elecampane tribe within the Asteraceae (sunflower family). It is found in parts of Africa and stretching across Asia to Indochina. It was described by Alexandre Henri Gabriel de Cassini (Cass.) in 1829, but the genus was later absorbed into the Pentanema genus (also within the Asteraceae family) until molecular analysis in 2018 determined it was a separate genus.

== Description ==
They are annual or perennial herbs, with simple (undivided or unsegmented), or entire (not divided) leaves. The leaves are arranged alternate (at different levels along the stem), with pinnately veining (lateral veins are arranged either side of the main vein) and they are mostly amplexicaule (the base is dilated and clasping the stem) at the base. They have flowers which have solitary, radiate heads (ray floret surrounding disc florets), which are either axillary (beside a leaf joint) or leaf opposed. They have a peduncle (flower stalk), and involucral bracts which are inbricate (overlapping) in several rows. The achenes (one-seeded indehiscent fruit) are subterete (partially circular in cross-section) with a pappus (a tuft or ring of hairs or scales borne above the ovary) of unequal bristles.

== Known species ==
There are about 14 accepted species;

- Vicoa albertoregelia C.Winkl.
- Vicoa cernua Dalzell
- Vicoa chodzhakasiani (Kinzik.) Nabiev
- Vicoa discoidea (Nabiev) Kamelin
- Vicoa glanduligera Krasch.
- Vicoa indica (L.) DC.
- Vicoa krascheninnikovii Kamelin
- Vicoa lignea (Mesfin) D.Gut.Larr., Santos-Vicente, Anderb., E.Rico & M.M.Mart.Ort.
- Vicoa multicaulis (Boiss.) Benth. & Hook.f.
- Vicoa parietarioides Nevski
- Vicoa propinqua Nevski
- Vicoa rupicola Krasch.
- Vicoa varzobica (Kamelin & Kinzik.) Nabiev
- Vicoa vestita (Wall. ex DC.) Benth. ex Hook.f.

Some species are still to be accepted, such as Vicoa gokhalei from India.

== Taxonomy ==
The genus name of Vicoa is in honour of Giambattista Vico (1668–1744), an Italian philosopher, rhetorician, historian, and jurist during the Italian Enlightenment. It was first described and published in Ann. Sci. Nat. (Paris) Vol.17 on page 418 in 1829.

It was then absorbed into the genus of Pentanema, until in 2018, the Vicoa genus was re-established due to molecular analysis of the Pentanema genus.

== Range ==
It is native to parts of Africa and Asia. From the island of Cape Verde, (Macaronesia), then the African countries of; Angola, Benin, Burkina Faso, Central African Republic, Chad, Eritrea, Ethiopia, Guinea-Bissau, Ivory Coast, Malawi, Mali, Mauritania, Mozambique, Senegal, Somalia, Sudan, Tanzania, Togo, Uganda, Zambia and Zimbabwe. Parts of Western Asia; Afghanistan and Iran. Central Asia; Kazakhstan, Kyrgyzstan, Tajikistan, Turkmenistan and Uzbekistan. China; south-central and southeast China and Tibet. Indian subcontinent; East Himalaya, India, Nepal, Pakistan, Sri Lanka and West Himalaya. Lastly, parts of Indochina; Myanmar, Thailand and Vietnam.

== Uses ==
Some species such as Vicoa indica have used in folk medicine, in the Himalayas. The roots were used to treat kidney troubles and the leaves were used for stomach problems.
