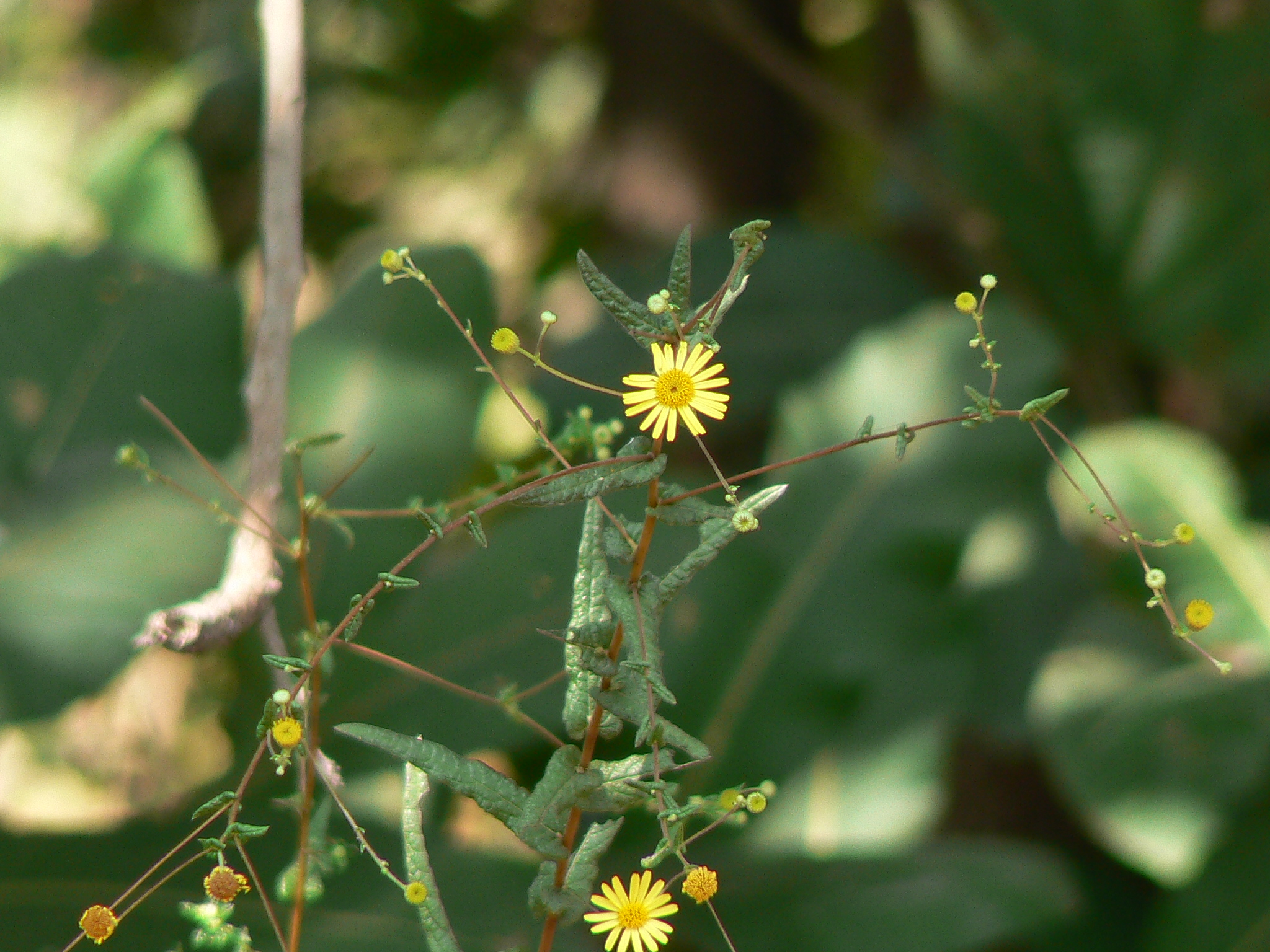
- Pentanema indicum

Scientific classification
- Kingdom: Plantae
- Clade: Tracheophytes
- Clade: Angiosperms
- Clade: Eudicots
- Clade: Asterids
- Order: Asterales
- Family: Asteraceae
- Subfamily: Asteroideae
- Tribe: Inuleae
- Genus: Pentanema; Cass.

Type species
- Pentanema divaricatum Cass.

Synonyms
- Amblyocarpum Fisch. & C.A.Mey.; Ulina Opiz; Varthemia DC.

= Pentanema =

Genus of flowering plants

Pentanema is a genus of Asian and African plants in the tribe Inuleae within the family Asteraceae.

== Species ==
The following species are recognised in the genus Pentanema:

- Pentanema alanyense H.Duman & Anderb.
- Pentanema aschersonianum (Janka) D.Gut.Larr., Santos-Vicente, Anderb., E.Rico & M.M.Mart.Ort.
- Pentanema asperum (Poir.) G.V.Boiko & Korniy.
- Pentanema auriculatum (Boiss. & Balansa) D.Gut.Larr., Santos-Vicente, Anderb., E.Rico & M.M.Mart.Ort.
- Pentanema bifrons (L.) D.Gut.Larr., Santos-Vicente, Anderb., E.Rico & M.M.Mart.Ort.
- Pentanema britannica (L.) D.Gut.Larr., Santos-Vicente, Anderb., E.Rico & M.M.Mart.Ort.
- Pentanema caspicum (F.K.Blum ex Ledeb.) G.V.Boiko, Korniy. & Mosyakin
- Pentanema confertiflorum (A.Rich.) D.Gut.Larr., Santos-Vicente, Anderb., E.Rico & M.M.Mart.Ort.
- Pentanema divaricatum Cass.
- Pentanema ensifolium (L.) D.Gut.Larr., Santos-Vicente, Anderb., E.Rico & M.M.Mart.Ort.
- Pentanema flexuosum (Boiss. & Hausskn.) Rech.f.
- Pentanema germanicum (L.) D.Gut.Larr., Santos-Vicente, Anderb., E.Rico & M.M.Mart.Ort.
- Pentanema gracile (Gilli) Rech.f.
- Pentanema helenioides (DC.) D.Gut.Larr., Santos-Vicente, Anderb., E.Rico & M.M.Mart.Ort.
- Pentanema helveticum (Weber) D.Gut.Larr., Santos-Vicente, Anderb., E.Rico & M.M.Mart.Ort.
- Pentanema hirtum (L.) D.Gut.Larr., Santos-Vicente, Anderb., E.Rico & M.M.Mart.Ort.
- Pentanema inuloides (Fisch. & C.A.Mey.) D.Gut.Larr., Santos-Vicente, Anderb., E.Rico & M.M.Mart.Ort.
- Pentanema kurdistanicum Maroofi & Ghaderi
- Pentanema langeanum (Beck) D.Gut.Larr., Santos-Vicente, Anderb., E.Rico & M.M.Mart.Ort.
- Pentanema maletii (Maire) D.Gut.Larr., Santos-Vicente, Anderb., E.Rico & M.M.Mart.Ort.
- Pentanema mariae (Bordz.) D.Gut.Larr., Santos-Vicente, Anderb., E.Rico & M.M.Mart.Ort.
- Pentanema × medium (M.Bieb.) G.V.Boiko & Korniy.
- Pentanema montanum (L.) D.Gut.Larr., Santos-Vicente, Anderb., E.Rico & M.M.Mart.Ort.
- Pentanema nematolepis Rech.f.
- Pentanema oculus-christi (L.) D.Gut.Larr., Santos-Vicente, Anderb., E.Rico & M.M.Mart.Ort.
- Pentanema orientale (Lam.) D.Gut.Larr., Santos-Vicente, Anderb., E.Rico & M.M.Mart.Ort.
- Pentanema persicum (DC.) D.Gut.Larr., Santos-Vicente, Anderb., E.Rico & M.M.Mart.Ort.
- Pentanema prasinurum Rech.f.
- Pentanema pulicariiforme (DC.) Jaub. & Spach
- Pentanema pygmaeum (Gilli) Rech.f.
- Pentanema sabuletorum (Czern. ex Lavrenko) G.V.Boiko & Korniy.
- Pentanema salicinum (L.) D.Gut.Larr., Santos-Vicente, Anderb., E.Rico & M.M.Mart.Ort.
- Pentanema spiraeifolium (L.) D.Gut.Larr., Santos-Vicente, Anderb., E.Rico & M.M.Mart.Ort.
- Pentanema squarrosum (L.) D.Gut.Larr., Santos-Vicente, Anderb., E.Rico & M.M.Mart.Ort.
- Pentanema verbascifolium (Willd.) D.Gut.Larr., Santos-Vicente, Anderb., E.Rico & M.M.Mart.Ort.

=== Formerly included ===
In 2018, the Vicoa genus was re-erected due to molecular analysis.

- Pentanema albertoregelium (C.Winkl.) Gorschk. → Vicoa albertoregelia
- Pentanema cernuum (Dalzell) Ling → Vicoa cernua
- Pentanema chodzhakasiani Kinzik. → Vicoa chodzhakasiani
- Pentanema discoideum Nabiev → Vicoa discoidea
- Pentanema glanduligerum (Krasch.) Gorschk. → Vicoa glanduligera
- Pentanema indicum (L.) - → Vicoa indica
- Pentanema krascheninnikovii (Kamelin) Czerep. → Vicoa krascheninnikovii
- Pentanema ligneum Mesfin → Vicoa lignea
- Pentanema multicaule Boiss. → Vicoa multicaulis
- Pentanema parietarioides (Nevski) Gorschk. → Vicoa parietarioides
- Pentanema propinquum Nevski → Vicoa propinqua
- Pentanema varzobicum Kamelin & Kinzik. → Vicoa varzobica
- Pentanema vestitum (Wall. ex DC.) Ling → Vicoa vestita
