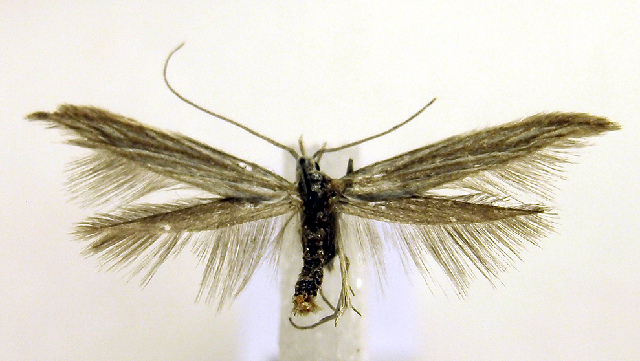

Scientific classification
- Kingdom: Animalia
- Phylum: Arthropoda
- Class: Insecta
- Order: Lepidoptera
- Family: Coleophoridae
- Genus: Coleophora
- Species: C. conyzae

Binomial name
- Coleophora conyzae Zeller, 1868

Synonyms
- Kuznetzovvlia vicolii Nemes, 2003

= Coleophora conyzae =

Species of moth

Coleophora conyzae is a moth of the family Coleophoridae. It is found from Sweden and Finland to the Iberian Peninsula, Corsica, Sicily and Crete and from Great Britain to Romania.

== Description ==
The wingspan is 12–16 mm. The adults have streaked white and buff forewings. They are on wing in June and July.

The larvae feed on hemp-agrimony (Eupatorium cannabinum), ploughman's-spikenard (Inula conyza), Inula oculus-christi and common fleabane (Pulicaria dysenterica). Full-grown larvae can be found at the end of May and in early June.
