= Spinacetin =

- Chemical structure of spinacetin

Names
- IUPAC name 3,4′,5,7-Tetrahydroxy-3′,6′-dimethoxyflavone
- Systematic IUPAC name 3,5,7-Trihydroxy-2-(4-hydroxy-3-methoxyphenyl)-6-methoxy-4H-1-benzopyran-4-one
- Other names Quercetagetin 3',6-dimethyl ether

Identifiers
CAS Number	3153-83-1
3D model (JSmol)	Interactive image
ChemSpider	4479178
PubChem CID	5321435
UNII	5FBC7BNF1S
CompTox Dashboard (EPA)	DTXSID10185433
- InChI: InChI=1S/C17H14O8/c1-23-10-5-7(3-4-8(10)18)16-15(22)13(20)12-11(25-16)6-9(19)17(24-2)14(12)21/h3-6,18-19,21-22H,1-2H3 Key: XWIDINOKCRFVHQ-UHFFFAOYSA-N; InChI=1/C17H14O8/c1-23-10-5-7(3-4-8(10)18)16-15(22)13(20)12-11(25-16)6-9(19)17(24-2)14(12)21/h3-6,18-19,21-22H,1-2H3 Key: XWIDINOKCRFVHQ-UHFFFAOYAE
- SMILES: COC1=C(C=CC(=C1)C2=C(C(=O)C3=C(C(=C(C=C3O2)O)OC)O)O)O

Properties
Chemical formula	C_{17}H_{14}O_{8}
Molar mass	346.291 g·mol^{−1}
- Except where otherwise noted, data are given for materials in their standard state (at 25 °C [77 °F], 100 kPa). verify (what is ?) Infobox references

Spinacetin is an O-methylated flavonol. It can be found in spinach (Spinacia oleracea).
