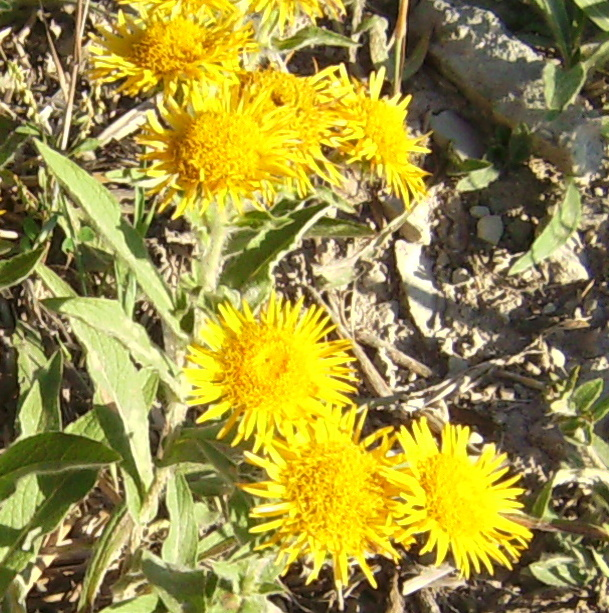

Scientific classification
- Kingdom: Plantae
- Clade: Tracheophytes
- Clade: Angiosperms
- Clade: Eudicots
- Clade: Asterids
- Order: Asterales
- Family: Asteraceae
- Genus: Pentanema
- Species: P. helenioides

Binomial name
- Pentanema helenioides (DC.) D.Gut.Larr., Santos-Vicente, Anderb., E.Rico & M.M.Mart.Ort.

Synonyms
- Helenium heleniodes (DC.) Kuntze; Inula dubia Pourr. ex Timb.-Lagr.; Inula helenioides DC.; Inula helenium Asso

= Pentanema helenioides =

Species of flowering plant

Pentanema helenioides is a species of plant in the family Asteraceae. It is native to southern France and north-central and eastern Spain.
