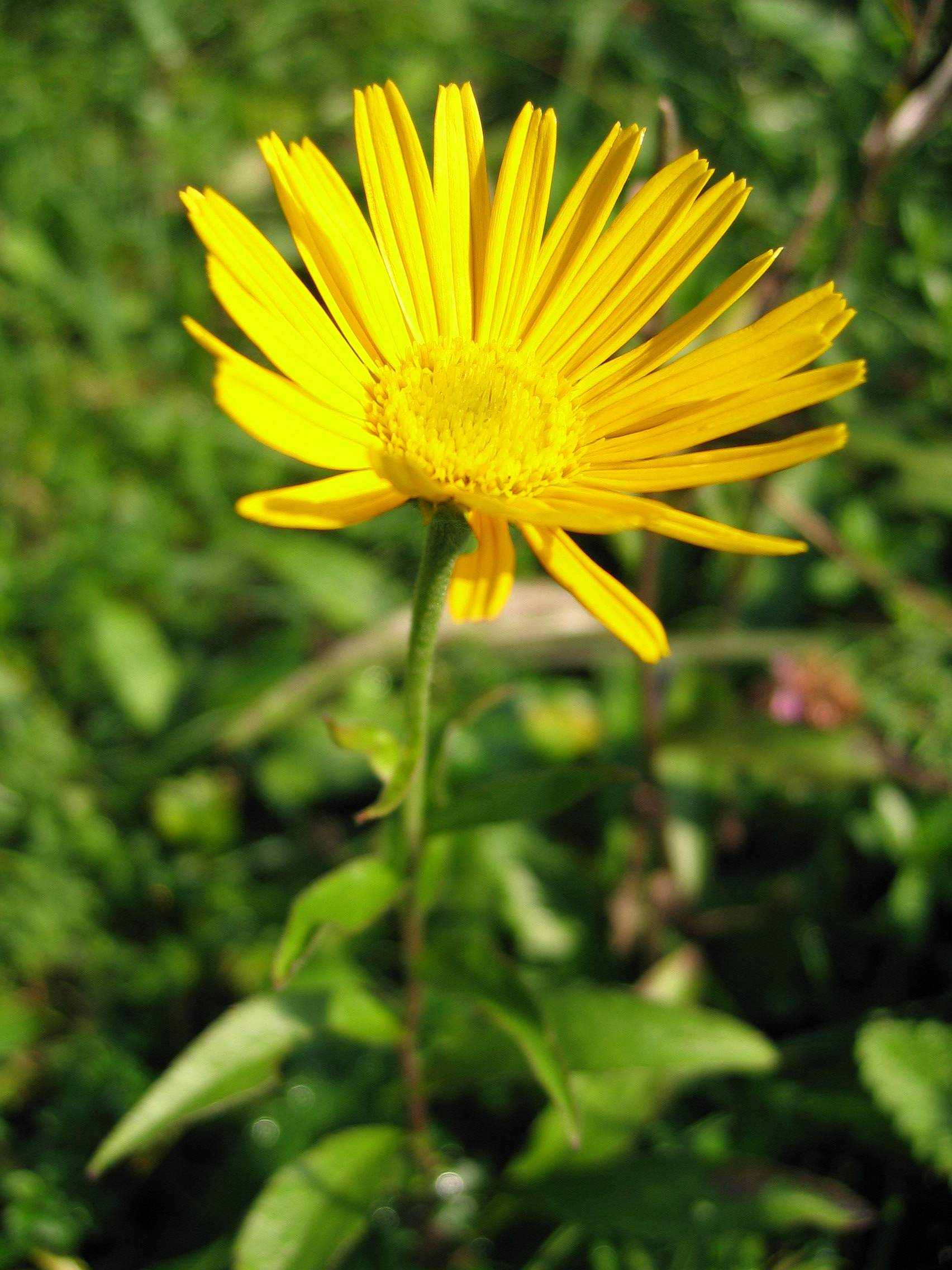
- Buphthalmum salicifolium

Scientific classification
- Kingdom: Plantae
- Clade: Embryophytes
- Clade: Tracheophytes
- Clade: Angiosperms
- Clade: Eudicots
- Clade: Asterids
- Order: Asterales
- Family: Asteraceae
- Subfamily: Asteroideae
- Tribe: Inuleae
- Genus: Buphthalmum; L. 1753 not Mill. 1754

Synonyms
- Buphtalmum spelling variant; Bustia Adans.; Asteroides Mill.; Xerolekia Anderb.

= Buphthalmum =

Genus of flowering plants

Buphthalmum is a genus of flowering plants in the aster family, Asteraceae. They are native to Europe, and B. salicifolium is in cultivation and has been introduced elsewhere.

== Description ==
These are perennial herbs with alternately arranged leaves. The inflorescence is a solitary flower head atop the stem. The head has very narrow phyllaries, yellow ray florets and yellow disc florets. The fruit is a cypsela usually tipped with a pappus of scales; those growing from the ray florets may lack pappi.

== Species ==
The following species are recognised in the genus Buphthalmum:

- Buphthalmum inuloides – Sardinia
- Buphthalmum salicifolium – western, central, and southern Europe; introduced in China, southeast Asia
- Buphthalmum speciosissimum - northern Italy
