= Axillarin =

- Chemical structure of axillarin

Names
- Preferred IUPAC name 2-(3,4-Dihydroxyphenyl)-5,7-dihydroxy-3,6-dimethoxy-4H-1-benzopyran-4-one
- Other names: 2-(3,4-Dihydroxyphenyl)-5,7-dihydroxy-3,6-dimethoxy-4H-chromen-4-one; DMQT; 3,6-Dimethoxyquercetagetin; Quercetagetin 3,6-dimethyl ether; 3',4',5,7-Tetrahydroxy-3,6-dimethoxyflavone

Identifiers
CAS Number	5188-73-8
3D model (JSmol)	Interactive image
ChEBI	CHEBI:2941
ChEMBL	ChEMBL487810
ChemSpider	4444922
PubChem CID	5281603
UNII	CF7D7U7ZK2
CompTox Dashboard (EPA)	DTXSID80199840
- InChI: InChI=1S/C17H14O8/c1-23-16-10(20)6-11-12(13(16)21)14(22)17(24-2)15(25-11)7-3-4-8(18)9(19)5-7/h3-6,18-21H,1-2H3 Key: KIGVXRGRNLQNNI-UHFFFAOYSA-N; InChI=1/C17H14O8/c1-23-16-10(20)6-11-12(13(16)21)14(22)17(24-2)15(25-11)7-3-4-8(18)9(19)5-7/h3-6,18-21H,1-2H3 Key: KIGVXRGRNLQNNI-UHFFFAOYAX
- SMILES: COC1=C(C=C2C(=C1O)C(=O)C(=C(O2)C3=CC(=C(C=C3)O)O)OC)O

Properties
Chemical formula	C_{17}H_{14}O_{8}
Molar mass	346.291 g·mol^{−1}
Density	1.659 g/mL
- Except where otherwise noted, data are given for materials in their standard state (at 25 °C [77 °F], 100 kPa). verify (what is ?) Infobox references

Axillarin is an O-methylated flavonol. It can be found in Pulicaria crispa, Filifolium sibiricum, Inula britannica, Wyethia bolanderi in Balsamorhiza macrophylla and in Tanacetum vulgare. It can also be synthesized.

== Glycosides ==
Axillarin 7-O-β-D-glucoside can be found in Tagetes mendocina, a plant used in traditional herbal medicine the Andean provinces of Argentina.
