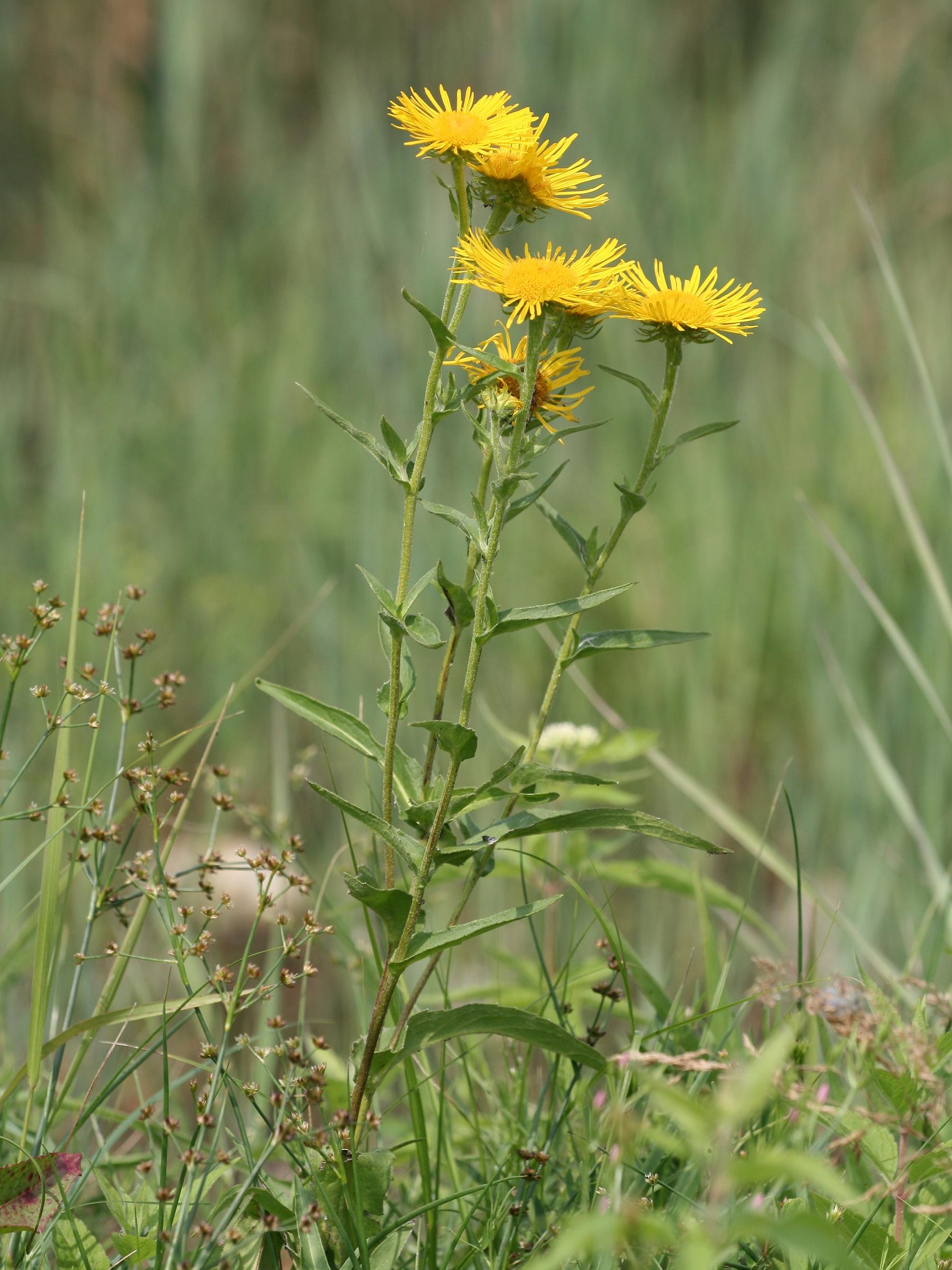

Scientific classification
- Kingdom: Plantae
- Clade: Tracheophytes
- Clade: Angiosperms
- Clade: Eudicots
- Clade: Asterids
- Order: Asterales
- Family: Asteraceae
- Genus: Pentanema
- Species: P. britannica

Binomial name
- Pentanema britannica (L.) D.Gut.Larr., Santos-Vicente, Anderb., E.Rico & M.M.Mart.Ort.

Synonyms
- Synonymy: Aster britannicus All.; Aster orientalis S.G.Gmel.; Aster undulatus Moench; Conyza britannica (L.) Kuntze; Helenium britannica (L.) Moris ex Rupr.; Helenium macrolepis Kuntze; Helenium microcephalum Kuntze; Helenium repandum Kuntze; Inula britannica L.; Inula chinensis (Kom.) Kom.; Inula comosa Lam.; Inula dichotoma Zuccagni; Inula encelioides Hornem. ex Ledeb.; Inula hirta Pollich; Inula micranthos DC.; Inula microcephala Borbás; Inula oetteliana Rchb.; Inula orientalis d'Urv. ex Boiss.; Inula serrata Gilib.; Inula squarrosa Krock.; Inula tymiensis Kudô; Inula vaillantii Schur ex Nyman

= Pentanema britannica =

Golden yellowhead

Species of flowering plant

Pentanema britannica, the British yellowhead or meadow fleabane, is a Eurasian species of plant in the daisy family. It is widespread across much of Europe and Asia, and sparingly naturalized in scattered locations in North America.

Pentanema britannica is an erect herb up to 75 cm (30 inches) tall, with fine hairs but not the thick woolly coat characterizing some related species. Leaves are lance-shaped, up to 5 cm (2 inches) long. One plant produces a few heads, each on a long flower stalk. Each had contains 50-150 yellow ray flowers and 100-250 yellow disc flowers.

The plant produces the flavonol axillarin.

== Medicinal uses ==
Pentanema britannica is used in Chinese Herbalism by harvesting and drying the flower. It has been used to treat sputum, as the Chinese found it to be beneficial when phlegm has accumulated in the bronchi. Other symptoms in which it has been found to be a clinical remedy for are nausea, vomiting, hiccups, and flatulence. The severity of the condition determines what part of the plant is used; if the symptoms are mild, the leaves are used, whereas more severe cases require use of the flowers.

A multitude of different chemical constituents have been isolated from Pentanema britannica. Some of the chemical constituents include steroids, terpenoids, phenolics and flavonoids. The majority of these compounds are found in the flowers and have been found to have anticancer, antioxidant, anti-inflammatory, neuroprotective and hepatoprotective properties. Pentanema britannica has pharmacological potential.

== Origin and current distribution ==
Pentanema britannica is native to regions of Europe and Asia and was first observed in North America after introduction to Ontario, Canada in 1928 and observation in Long Island, New York before 1915. Following the introduction of Pentanema britannica in New York, it was then introduced to Michigan in 1990, Minnesota in 2004, and Oregon in 2002.

The current distribution of this species is extensive and includes a multitude of countries spanning several continents. In Europe, this includes Albania, Austria, Belgium, Bulgaria, Czech Republic, Slovakia, Denmark, Finland, France, Germany, Greece, Hungary, Italy, Luxembourg, Netherlands, Norway, Poland, Romania, Russia/USSR (Northern Region, Baltic Region, Central Region, Southwestern Region, Crimea, Southeastern Region), Spain, Sweden, Switzerland, Turkey (European part), and Yugoslavia. In Asia, this includes China (North and Northeastern), Korea, Iran, Armenia, Kurdistan, Dzhyuungaria-Kashgaria, Mongolia, USSR (Eastern Siberia, Far East, Soviet Central Asia), and several of the Japanese islands (Hokkaido, Honshu, Shikoku, and Kyushu). In North America, this includes Canada (Ontario and Quebec) and the United States (New York, Michigan, Minnesota, and Oregon).

== Modes of distribution ==
Several modes of distribution have been identified for being responsible for the spread of P. britannica. These include contaminated plant parts (specifically hostas), wind, and locally on machinery within plant nurseries. An example of this was how it was discovered in November 1999 within a west Michigan nursery and was found difficult to control after being accidentally imported with Dutch hosta plants. Furthermore, due to its known medicinal uses, P. britannica may also be transported via humans within passenger baggage.

== Characteristics as an invasive species ==
Observations of Pentanema britannica in various new habitats have led to conclusions that it is capable of thriving in a wide range of temperatures as well as climates, indicated by its presence in Sweden and eastern North America, respectively. A limiting (and, thus influential) factor of the successful establishment of P. britannica in new habitats is moisture, with higher moisture levels corresponding to a higher level of invasibility. Furthermore, this species was suspected to have been introduced without any natural enemies, which also has been speculated to contribute to its success as an invasive species Within its original habitat as well as new ones, P. britannica is known to infest nursery crops, specifically hostas (also known as plantain lilies) in the Netherlands where their roots and rhizomes become intertwined with the hosta root systems. Specifically, root fragments of P. britannica are known to enter under bulb scales. Once intertwined, this plant is aggressive and hard to remove, and can remain even after the infested hosta roots are washed. The overall impact of this species is that it is harmful, as upon infestation, P. britannica impedes hostas from retrieving valuable nutrients from the soil. It has been identified as posing a threat to the environments that it invades due to having the potential to cause damage to invaded plant ecosystems and loss of native plant life. Additionally, economic risks have been weighed and taken into consideration, and it has been determined to pose a large one due to the wide range of habitats that it can invade and environmental damage it is capable of causing.

== Intervention and control measures ==
Some of the first recommendations for controlling P. britannica when it was discovered in Michigan nurseries involved methods of both chemical and mechanical control. It was proposed that, from a mechanical standpoint, deep plowing or cultivation was effective, while Roundup was an effective chemical method of control. When using Roundup, one can be strategic in targeting the "mother plant" of P. britannica, which is known to connect to a network of smaller satellite weeds connected by a network of rhizomes. Thus, by targeting the mother plant, the satellites can be effectively eliminated while using a minimal amount of the herbicide. A lesser-known form of control is biological methods, in which known predators (pests) of P. britannica are deployed to consume the weed. One such predator is the moth Hellinsia inulae. There is not much information on the current status of mitigation efforts to control P. britannica. After detection in its hosta nurseries in 1990, Michigan made efforts to restrict the movement, distribution, and sale of the infested hostas to prevent further spread. Four years later P. britannica was placed on the Netherlands' noxious weed list for export.
