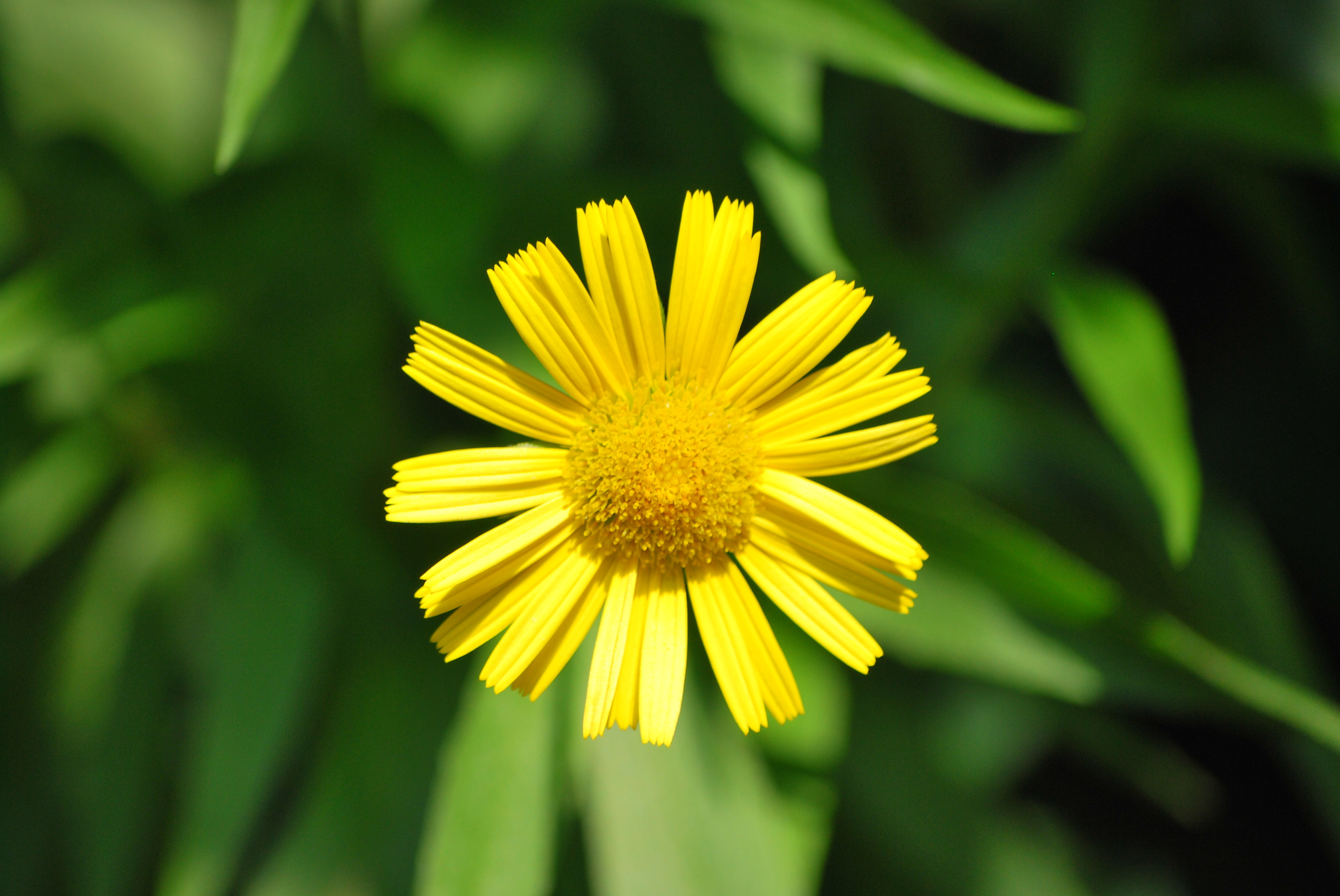

Scientific classification
- Kingdom: Plantae
- Clade: Tracheophytes
- Clade: Angiosperms
- Clade: Eudicots
- Clade: Asterids
- Order: Asterales
- Family: Asteraceae
- Genus: Buphthalmum
- Species: B. salicifolium

Binomial name
- Buphthalmum salicifolium L.

Synonyms
- Buphthalmum alpicola Buphthalmum grandiflorum Buphthalmum gussonii Buphthalmum succisifolium

= Buphthalmum salicifolium =

Species of flowering plant

Buphthalmum salicifolium is a species of flowering plant in the aster family, Asteraceae. It is known by the common name ox-eye. It is native to Europe.

This perennial herb reaches 50 to 70 centimeters in height with an erect, purple-red stem. The leaves are alternately arranged and vary in shape and size. The lower leaves are widest and the blades are borne on petioles, and the upper leaves are narrow and have no petioles. The flower head is solitary atop the stem and at the ends of branches. It has yellow ray florets with 2 to 4 teeth at the tips and tubular yellow disc florets at the center. The fruit is a cypsela with a pappus of scales.

This is the plant (Yellow Ox Eye) which was given to medal winners at the European Championships Munich 2022
