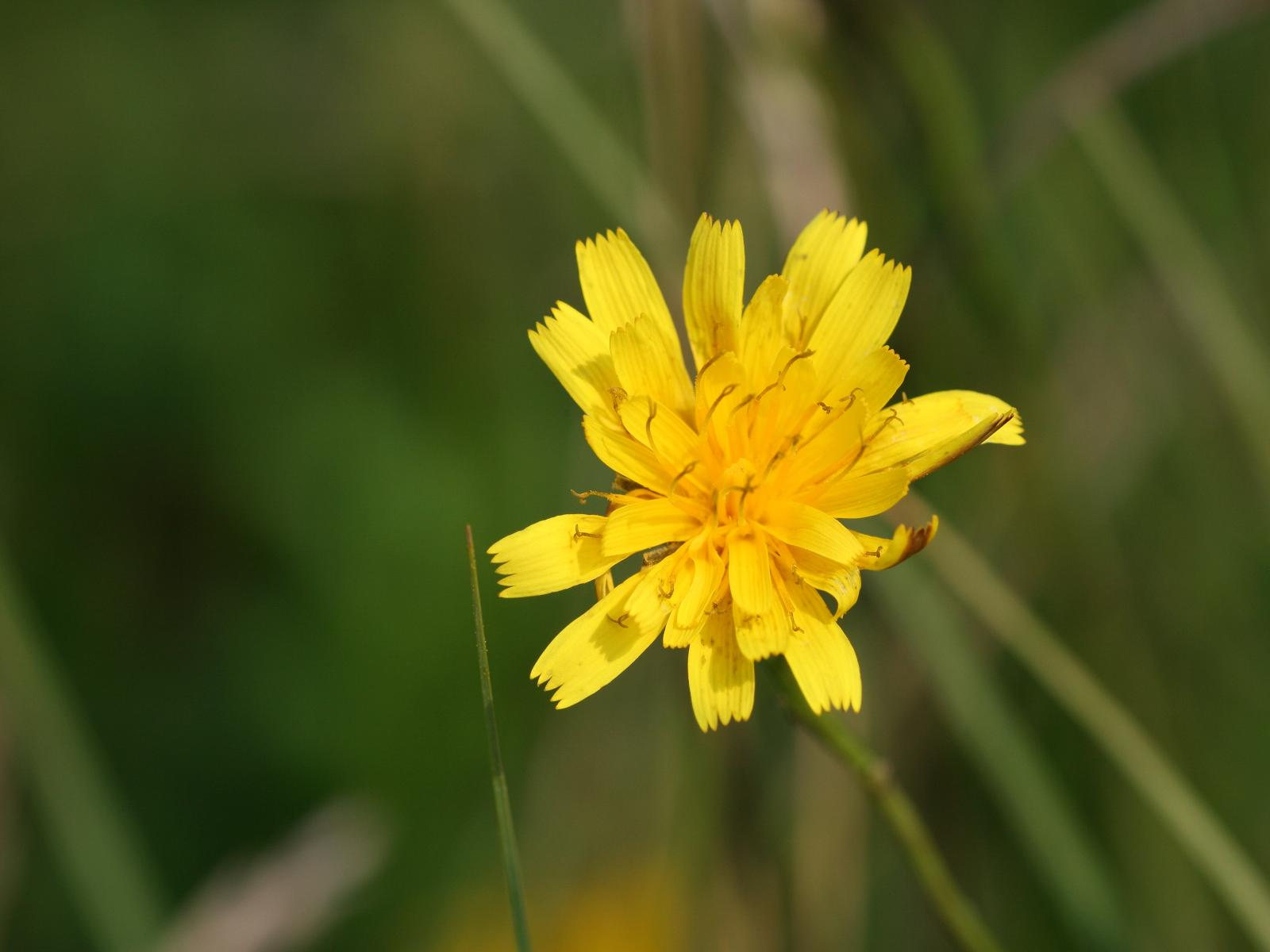

Scientific classification
- Kingdom: Plantae
- Clade: Tracheophytes
- Clade: Angiosperms
- Clade: Eudicots
- Clade: Asterids
- Order: Asterales
- Family: Asteraceae
- Genus: Scorzoneroides
- Species: S. autumnalis

Binomial name
- Scorzoneroides autumnalis (L.) Moench

Synonyms
- Leontodon autumnalis L.

= Scorzoneroides autumnalis =

Species of flowering plant

Scorzoneroides autumnalis, commonly called autumn hawkbit, is a perennial plant species, widespread in its native range in Eurasia (from Europe east to western Siberia), and introduced in North America.

The plant is sometimes called fall dandelion, because it is very similar to the common dandelion (one of the main differences being a branched stem with several capitula), but "yellow fields", covered by this plant appear much later than dandelions, towards the autumn in Eastern Europe. In the Latin synonym of the plant name, Leontodon autumnalis, "leontodon" means "lion's tooth", the same as "dandelion".

== Description ==
Scorzoneroides autumnalis is a perennial herb growing to 35 cm high usually with branched stems and several flower-heads each about 30 mm across. The florets are all ligulate and bright yellow. The leaves are all basal and linear-oblong.

== Reproduction ==
Flowers in June to October producing achenes.

== Habitat ==
Frequent in damp grassland and meadows.

== Ecology ==
The fly Tephritis leontodontis is known to attack the capitula of this plant.

== Distribution ==
Abundant in Ireland and Great Britain.
