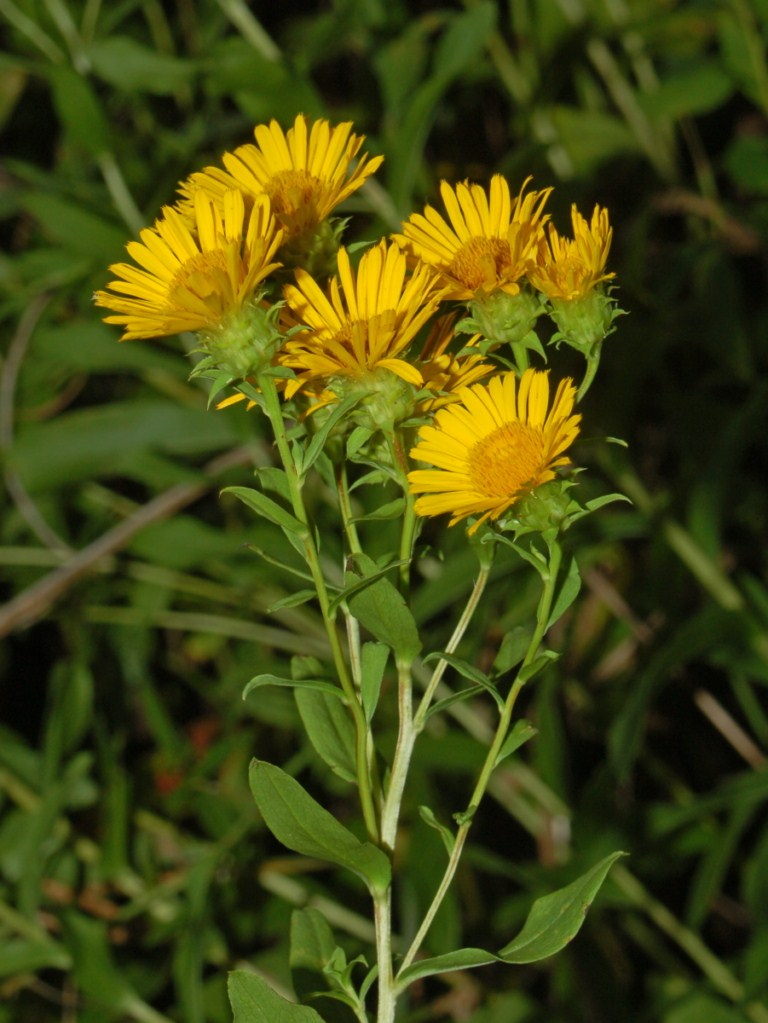

Scientific classification
- Kingdom: Plantae
- Clade: Tracheophytes
- Clade: Angiosperms
- Clade: Eudicots
- Clade: Asterids
- Order: Asterales
- Family: Asteraceae
- Genus: Pentanema
- Species: P. spiraeifolium

Binomial name
- Pentanema spiraeifolium (L.) D.Gut.Larr., Santos-Vicente, Anderb., E.Rico & M.M.Mart.Ort.

Synonyms
- List: Aster bubonium Scop.; Aster pubescens Moench; Aster squarrosus (L.) All.; Erigeron squarrosus (L.) Clairv.; Helenium hispidum Kuntze; Helenium squarrosum (L.) Kuntze; Inula bubonium (L.) Jacq.; Inula cordata Freyn ex Nyman; Inula foliosa Schrad. ex Nyman; Inula germanica Vill.; Inula hispida Schur; Inula myrtifolia L.; Inula scaberrima (Rohlena) A.W.Hill; Inula spiraeifolia L.; Inula squarrosa L.

= Pentanema spiraeifolium =

Species of flowering plant

Pentanema spiraeifolium is a species perennial herbaceous plant belonging to the family Asteraceae. It is found from Europe to Iran.

== Description ==
Pentanema spiraeifolium reaches a height of 30–80 centimetres (12–31 in). The middle leaves are oblong-elliptic and they measure 3–5 centimetres (1.2–2.0 in) of length and 1–2 centimetres (0.39–0.79 in) of width. The base of the leaves is not embracing the stem. The upper cauline leaves are erect, with a round base. The stem is erect and branched, with numerous flowers (two to twelve). The outer ones are ligulate and bright yellow, while the inner ones are tubular dark orange. The flower's attachment to the stalk (receptacle) is covered by clearly curved scales. The flowering period extends from June to August.

== Distribution ==
This plant is found in southern France, Italy, Switzerland, and the Balkans.

== Habitat ==
They can be found up to 700 metres (2,300 ft) above sea level, in most environments, rocky, arid and hot.
