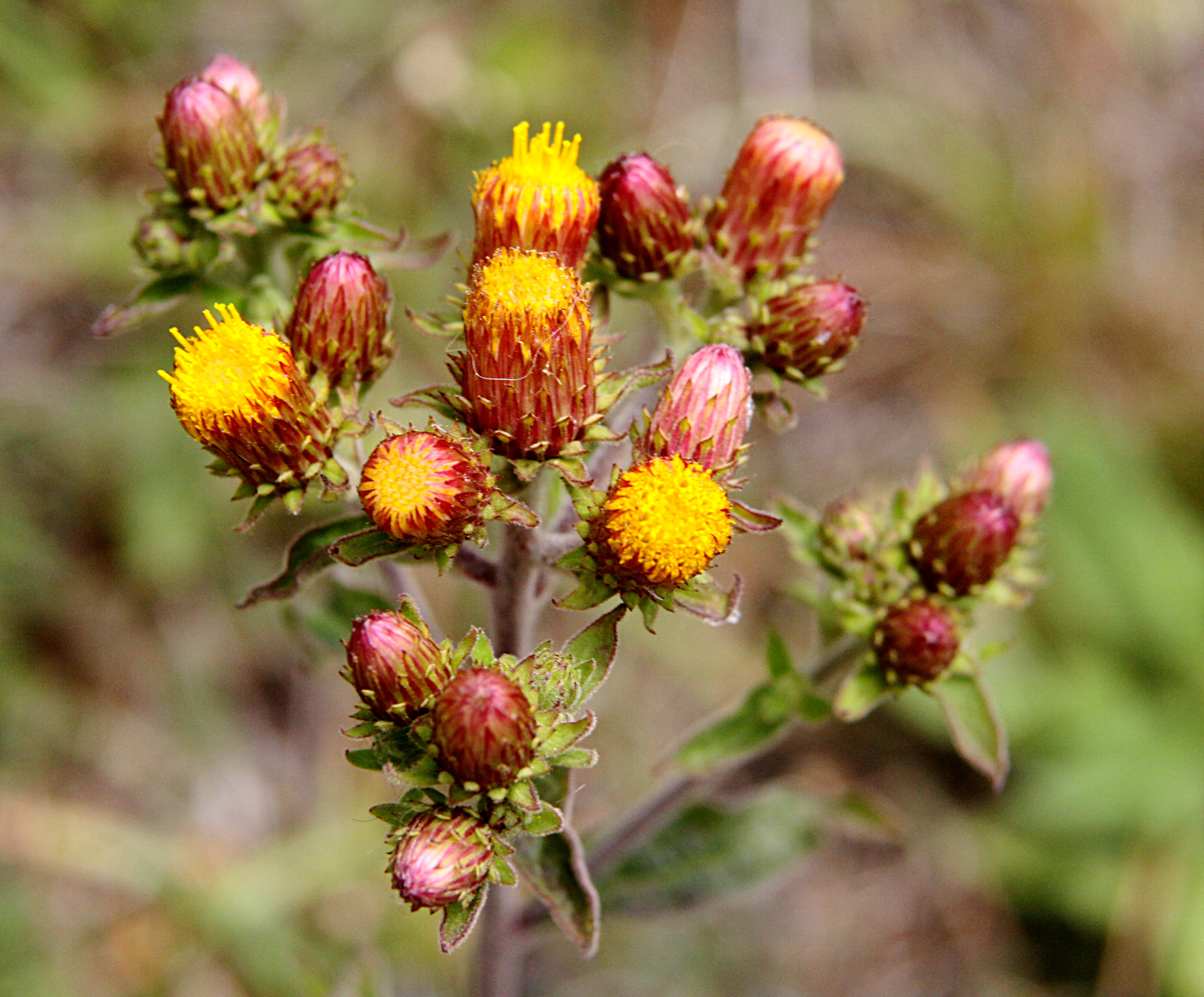

Scientific classification
- Kingdom: Plantae
- Clade: Embryophytes
- Clade: Tracheophytes
- Clade: Spermatophytes
- Clade: Angiosperms
- Clade: Eudicots
- Clade: Asterids
- Order: Asterales
- Family: Asteraceae
- Genus: Pentanema
- Species: P. squarrosum

Binomial name
- Pentanema squarrosum (L.) D.Gut.Larr., Santos-Vicente, Anderb., E.Rico & M.M.Mart.Ort.

Synonyms
- List: Aster conyzae Griess.; Conyza squarrosa L.; Conyza vulgaris Lam.; Helenium vulgare Kuntze; Inula conyza DC.; Inula conyzae (Griess.) Meikle; Inula foetida Dulac; Inula squarrosa Bernh. ex DC.; Inula vulgaris Trevis.; Jacobaea canzya (DC.) Merino; Inula suaveolens Jacq.; Pentanema conyzae (Griess.) D.Gut.Larr., Santos-Vicente, Anderb., E.Rico & M.M.Mart.Ort.

= Pentanema squarrosum =

Species of flowering plant in the daisy family Asteraceae

Pentanema squarrosum (syn. Inula conyzae), ploughman's-spikenard, is a species of plant in the Asteraceae found in Europe, North Africa, and the Near East. It is an aromatic herb that grows in calcareous grassland and was in the past sometimes harvested as a substitute for true spikenard, or nard, Nardostachys jatamansi.

== Description ==
Ploughman's spikenard is a softly hairy plant up to about 130 cm tall with a much-branched, often purplish stem and an irregularly thickened taproot. The leaves and roots are aromatic, especially in spring, with a faint spicy, cinnamon or cumin smell. It is usually a biennial or short-lived perennial, with an overwintering rosette.

The leaves are softly furry with long, simple hairs that are thicker on the veins than on the lamina. The basal leaves are up to 15 cm long, ovate to lanceolate and slightly pointed at the tip, with a short petiole that clasps the stem ("semiamplexicaul"). The upper leaves are gradually smaller and narrower, with shorter petioles, and the topmost are sessile.

Flowering occurs in late summer. The inflorescence is a loose corymbose panicle of capitula on long stalks. Each capitulum, or flowerhead, has many rows of purple phyllaries (bracts) around the outside and a dense cluster of tiny yellow flowers in the middle. The outer flowers are female and have 3 lobes with slightly elongated rays, or ligules, to about 9 mm and a forked style. The inner ones are 7 mm long with 5 lobes, bisexual with 5 fused stamens and a forked style.

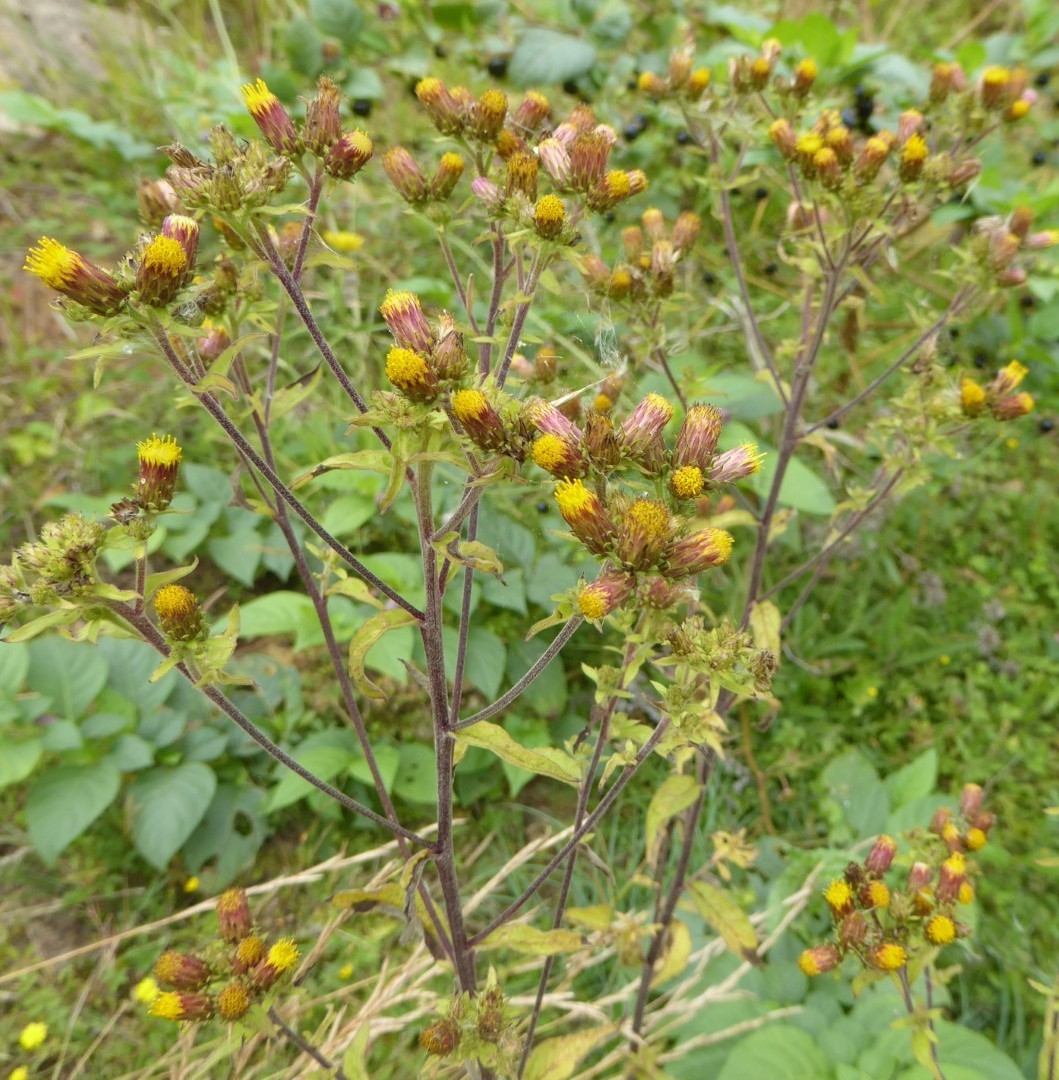
Inflorescence of Ploughman's spikenard

The fruit is an achene about 2 mm long with a pappus of white, 8 mm hairs.

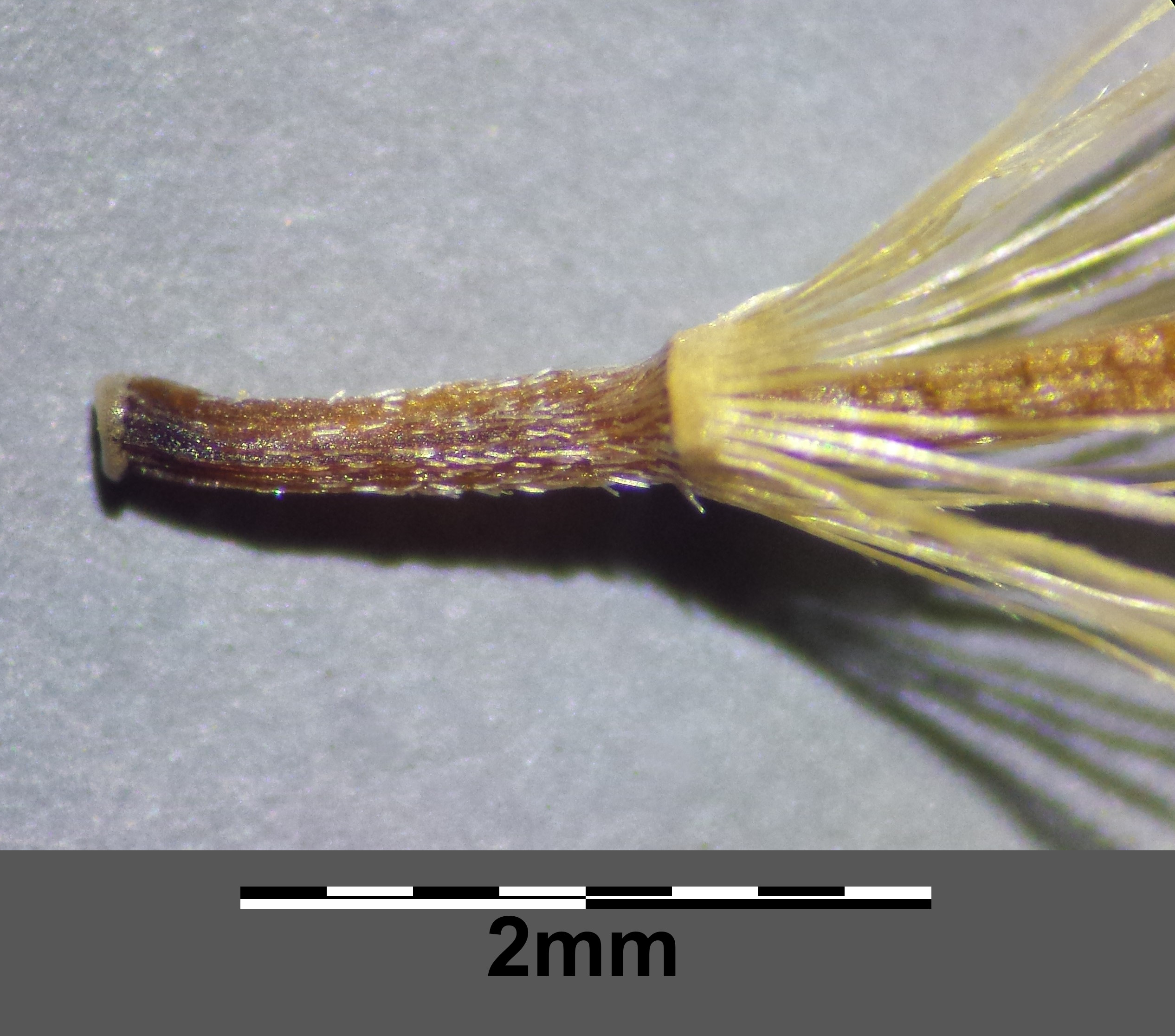
The fruit is an achene.

== Identification ==
When flowering, ploughman's spikenard presents few problems of identification, but the basal leaves strongly resemble those of foxglove. Although these two species do not grow together, it can be difficult to identify them correctly. Ploughman's spikenard has softly hairy leaves with usually entire (not toothed) margins (or sometimes with teeth that are tipped by a prominent hydathode) and, of course, a distinct fragrance, at least in spring and summer.

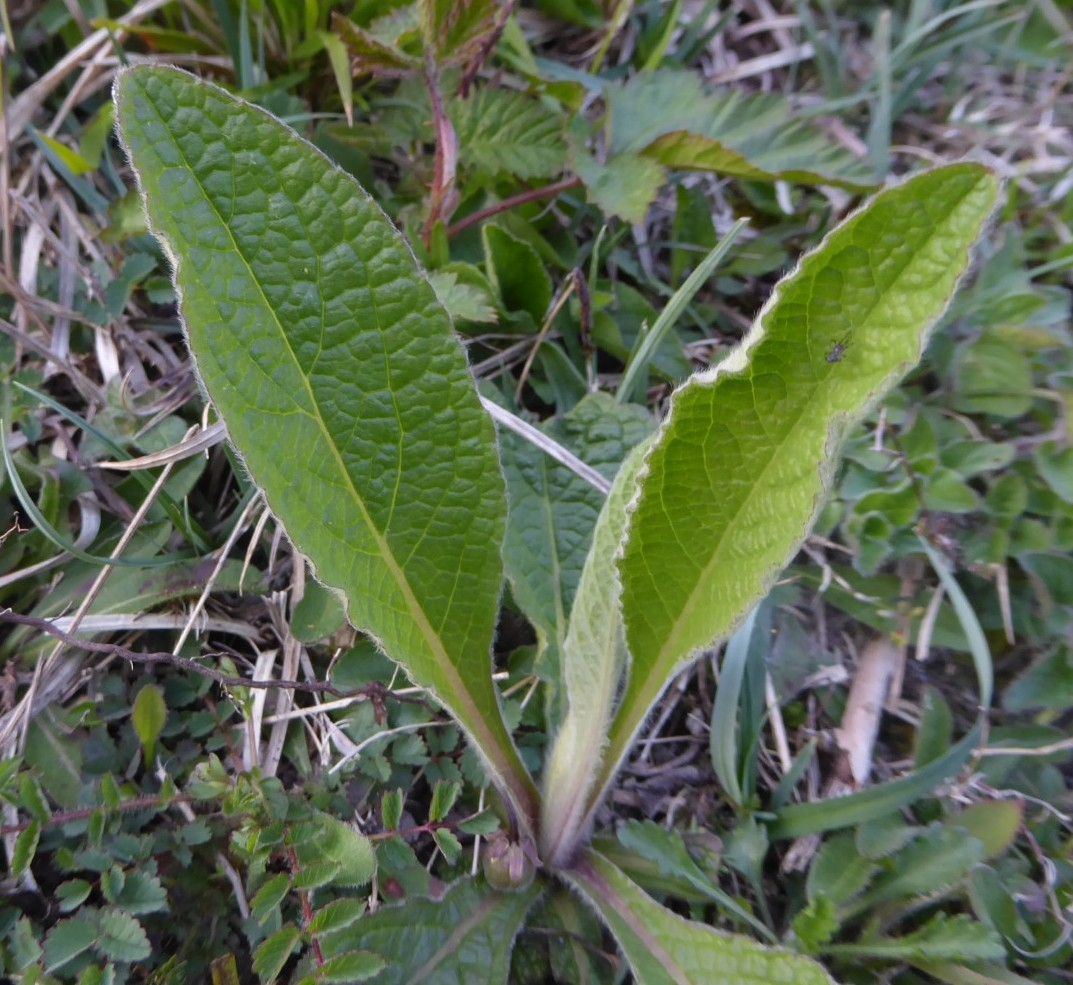
The basal leaves of ploughman's spikenard resemble those of foxglove.

== Taxonomy ==
The original name (basionynm) for this species was Conyza squarrosa, assigned by Linnaeus in Species Plantarum in 1753. In this he quotes an earlier polynomial in Hortus Cliffortianus, Conyza foliis lanceolatis acutis, caule annuo corymboso ("the fleabane with spear-shaped, pointed leaves and an annual, corymbose stem"). Another old name for it was Conyza major vulgaris ("the big, common fleabane"), in Bauhin's Pinax theatri botanici (1623). Linnaeus described it simply as growing in dry places in Germany, Belgium, Britain and France.

In 1985 it was renamed Inula conyzae by Desmond Meikle, and most publications have listed it as that until recently, but in 2019 it was renamed Pentanema squarrosum.

The common name 'ploughman's spikenard' refers to an incense or fragrance known as nard (νάρδος in Ancient Greek), which is mentioned several times in the Bible as an expensive luxury item. The word nard comes ultimately from the Sanskrit नलद (nálada), a rare Himalayan plant called Nardostachys jatamansi. The addition of 'spike' to the name may be a reference to the taproot, from which the essential oil is extracted. In Europe during the Middle Ages, ploughman's spikenard would have been a cheap substitute, so called because it also has a taproot with a fragrant odour which has been described as a faint cinnamon smell.

Its common names across Europe testify to its usefulness: in German it is Duerrwurz ("dried root"); in French Herbe aux Mouches ("herb of flies"). English common names include cinnamon root, great fleabane and horse heal.

Its chromosome number is 2n = 32. There are no known hybrids or subspecies.

== Distribution and status ==
Ploughman's Spikenard is native to Europe, Western Asia and North Africa. It has also been introduced to Columbia and New Zealand.

It has not been evaluated for the IUCN Red List while in Britain it is classified as "least concern" because it is quite common and is not threatened.

In many parts of Britain, ploughman's spikenard is classified as an axiophyte, which means its presence is an indication of favourable conservation status, so it is likely to be counted towards site designation (for wildlife sites, nature reserves, etc) and used in monitoring their condition.

== Habitat and ecology ==
Ploughman's spikenard only grows on calcareous soils over chalk, limestone or sand. It prefers very short swards and often occurs in areas of disturbance, such as roadsides and old quarries. It is rarely abundant and often occurs as scattered plants. In the British National Vegetation Classification, it is found in Calcicolous grasslands CG1, CG2, CG3, CG4, CG5 and CG7.

Ploughman's spikenard is host to various flying insect pollinators and at least 48 parasites, including oxtongue broomrape, which is very rare in Britain but more common in Europe; the spikenard case-bearer moth, which is oligophagous on this plant and related fleabanes; and Coleosporium inulae, a type of rust fungus which has part of its life cycle on pine trees and part on members of the Asteraceae.

== Uses ==
The dried and powdered root makes a pungent type of incense, and this is probably why it was given the name ploughman's (cf. poor man's) spikenard, although the smell is not much like true spikenard. It is also said that the dried leaves can burned and used as an insecticide and parasiticide, especially against fleas.
