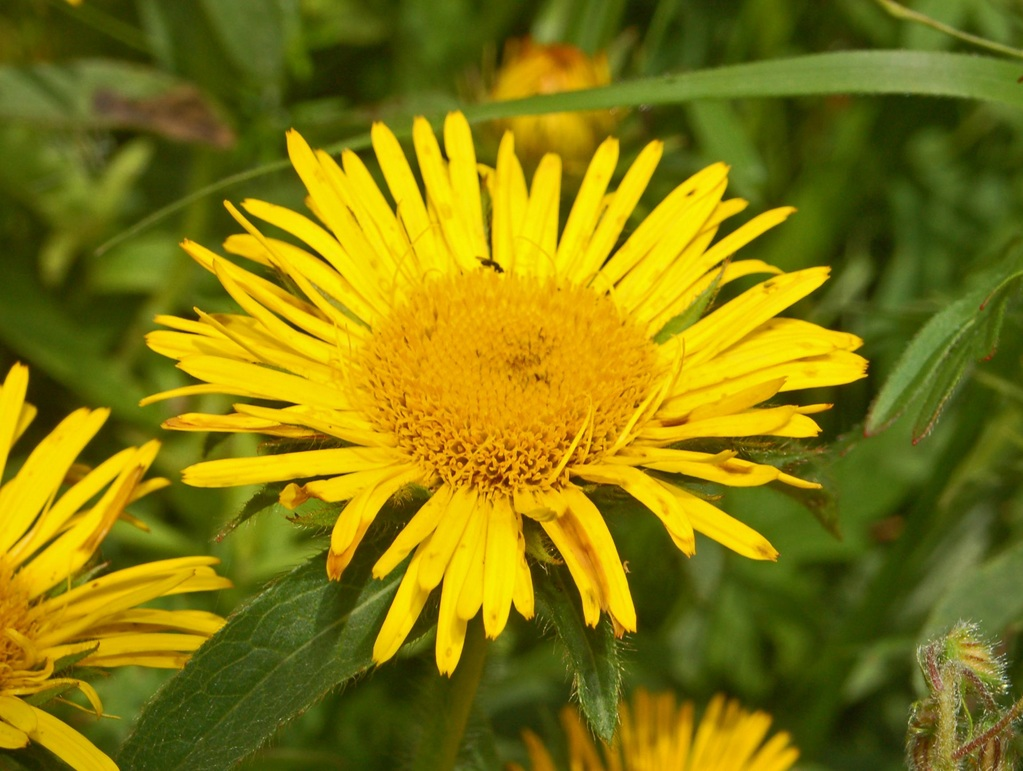

Scientific classification
- Kingdom: Plantae
- Clade: Tracheophytes
- Clade: Angiosperms
- Clade: Eudicots
- Clade: Asterids
- Order: Asterales
- Family: Asteraceae
- Genus: Pentanema
- Species: P. hirtum

Binomial name
- Pentanema hirtum (L.) D.Gut.Larr., Santos-Vicente, Anderb., E.Rico & M.M.Mart.Ort.

Synonyms
- List: Aster hirtus (L.) Scop.; Helenium hirtum (L.) Kuntze; Inula ensiformis Gandoger (1875); Inula hirsuta Gueldenstaedt (1791) non Vitman; Inula hirta L.; Inula involucrata Kaleniczenko (1837); Inula melanolepidea Kaleniczenko (1845); Inula obvallata Kit.; Jacobaea hirta (L.) Merino; Pulicaria hirta (L.) J.Presl & C.Presl; Ulina hirta (L.) Opiz

= Pentanema hirtum =

Species of flowering plant

Pentanema hirtum is a species of perennial herbaceous plant belonging to the family Asteraceae. The specific Latin name hirtum refers to the type of hairiness (bristly and rough) of the plant.

== Description ==
Pentanema hirtum reaches a height of 20–40 centimetres (7.9–15.7 in). The stem is ascending, simple (unbranched) and cylindrical, the surface is striped and hairy. These plants are covered with stiff hairs, almost bristly and light in color. The underground portion consists of a moderate-sized oblique rhizome of a light color. The average size of the rhizome is 2 millimetres (0.079 in) in width and 25 millimetres (0.98 in) in length.

All the leaves along the stem (cauline) are alternately arranged, irregularly toothed, erect, tomentose on both sides and hairy on the edge. They are usually laminar, leathery and rough. The base is rounded and the apex is obtuse. The average size of the leaves varies from 15–20 millimetres (0.59–0.79 in) of width to a length of 40–50 millimetres (1.6–2.0 in). Lower leaves have an elliptical or elliptical-lanceolate shape and have a thin petiole. Their size is more or less similar to that of the cauline. Upper leaves are sessile, amplexicaul (their base is embracing the stem) and more lanceolate.

The flowers are hermaphrodite. The outer flowers are ligulate, bright yellow and female, while the inner ones are tubular, dark yellow and bisexual. The diameter of the flower varies from 35–50 millimetres (1.4–2.0 in). The flowering period extends from May through late September. The fruits are glabrous achenes with hairy appendages (pappus).

== Distribution ==
This plant is distributed on Alps, Vosges, Jura Mountains, Pyrenees, Carpathian Mountains, Dinaric Alps, and Balkan Mountains. In the European plains this plant is widespread in southern France and through the Balkan Peninsula to the Caucasus and southern Russia.

== Habitat ==
This species prefers dry meadows and pastures of hills and mountains. They can be found up to 1,500 metres (4,900 ft) above sea level.
