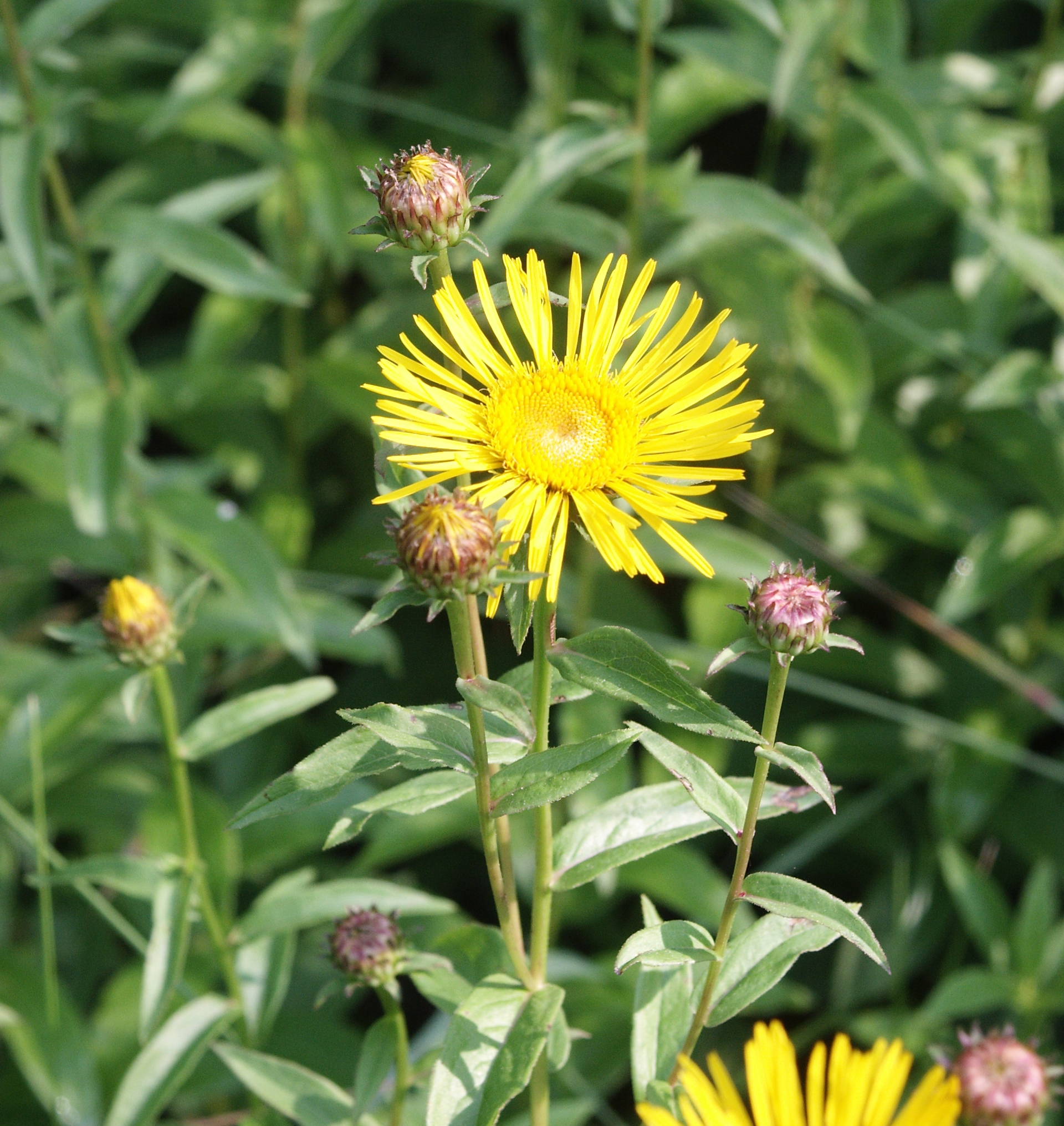

Scientific classification
- Kingdom: Plantae
- Clade: Tracheophytes
- Clade: Angiosperms
- Clade: Eudicots
- Clade: Asterids
- Order: Asterales
- Family: Asteraceae
- Genus: Pentanema
- Species: P. salicinum

Binomial name
- Pentanema salicinum (L.) D.Gut.Larr., Santos-Vicente, Anderb., E.Rico & M.M.Mart.Ort.

Synonyms
- List: Aster rigidus Moench; Aster salicinus (L.) Scop.; Aster spathularis Steud.; Conyza salicina (L.) Rupr.; Helenium cordatum (Boiss.) Kuntze; Helenium salicinum (L.) Kuntze; Inula auriculata Schur; Inula cordata Boiss.; Inula coriacea Schur; Inula glabra Gilib.; Inula involucrata Miq.; Inula kitamurana Tatew. ex Kitam.; Inula lineata (Nyár.) Nyár.; Inula lucens Dulac; Inula pseudobubonium Schur; Inula pseudosalicina Simkov. ex Beck; Inula salicina L.; Inula semiamplexicaulis Reut.; Inula squarrosa Griseb.; Jacobaea salicina (L.) Merino; Pulicaria salicina (L.) J.Presl & C.Presl; Ulina salicina (L.) Opiz

= Pentanema salicinum =

Species of flowering plant

Pentanema salicinum (common name Irish fleabane (UK) or willowleaf yellowhead) is a plant species in the family Asteraceae. It is found across Eurasia from Portugal to Japan. It has been reported growing in the wild in a few scattered locations in North America but it has not become widely established there.

== Taxonomy ==
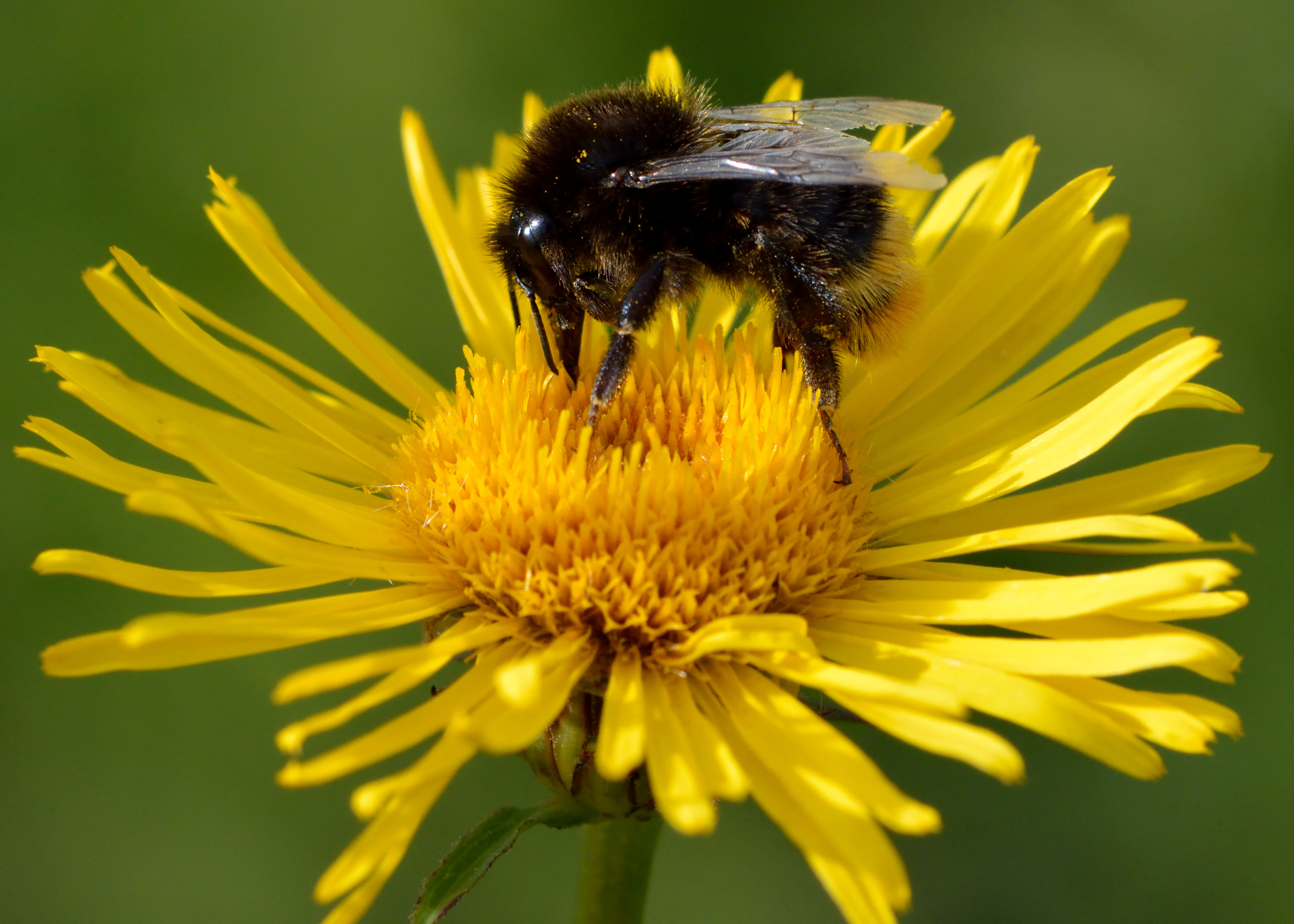
Pollination by red-tailed bumblebee

Pentanema salicinum was first described by Carl Linnaeus in 1753. It is known from a variety of common names including willowleaf yellowhead, Irish fleabane and willow-leaved Inula. Since its initial description it has also been ascribed a variety of Latin names, all of which are now regarded as synonyms and probably reflecting the still uncertain taxonomy of the genus, it being regarded as possibly paraphyletic.

== Distribution ==
Pentanema salicinum is to be found extensively across mainland western Europe, from Spain through France, Benelux, Germany, Poland, Denmark and southern Scandinavia. It only has a very restricted distribution is the British Isles, being confined to a small area of south central Ireland, around Lough Derg in north County Tipperary and south-east County Galway. Indeed, it is now reported that it can only be found at a single locality, having been eliminated from former sites through human activity. The species has become a flagship species and a focus for conservation efforts, with a co-ordinated program to reintroduce the plant already well underway. The plant is regarded a member of the Lusitanian flora in that it is a member of a group of plants that are specific to south west Ireland, are not found in the rest of the British Isles and are plants that are more normally seen in the Mediterranean. It is not known how this group of plants became established in Ireland, but it is likely to have been in the last 10,000 years since the end of the last ice age.

== Description ==
Pentanema salicinum is an upright herb, 20–80 centimetres (7.9–31.5 in) in height, with a thin stem, narrow, elongate, alternate, stemless leaves, which with the stem are roughly haired. The flower heads are carried singly at the top of the stem, are 2.5–4 centimetres (0.98–1.57 in) in diameter. Each head contains 35-70 yellow ray flowers containing 100-250 yellow disc flowers.
